= Great Western Railway ships =

Ferries operated by a British railway company

Great Western Railway (shipping services)
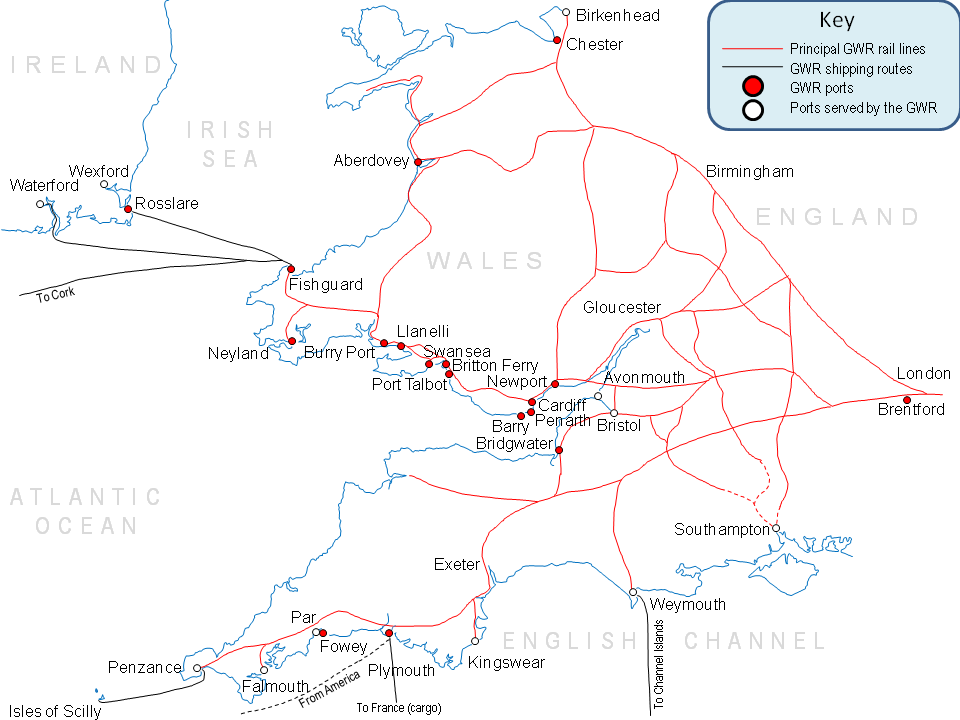
- The Great Western Railway’s principal routes and docks
- Predecessor: Ford and Jackson
- Founded: 1871
- Defunct: 1948
- Successor: British Railways
- Headquarters: Milford/Fishguard, Wales
- Parent: Great Western Railway

The Great Western Railway's ships operated in connection with the company's trains to provide services to Ireland, the Channel Islands and France. Powers were granted by act of Parliament for the Great Western Railway (GWR) to operate ships in 1871. The following year the company took over the ships operated by Ford and Jackson on the route between Wales and Ireland. Services were operated between Weymouth, the Channel Islands and France on the former Weymouth and Channel Islands Steam Packet Company routes. Smaller GWR vessels were also used as tenders at Plymouth and on ferry routes on the River Severn and River Dart. The railway also operated tugs and other craft at their docks in Wales and South West England.

== History ==
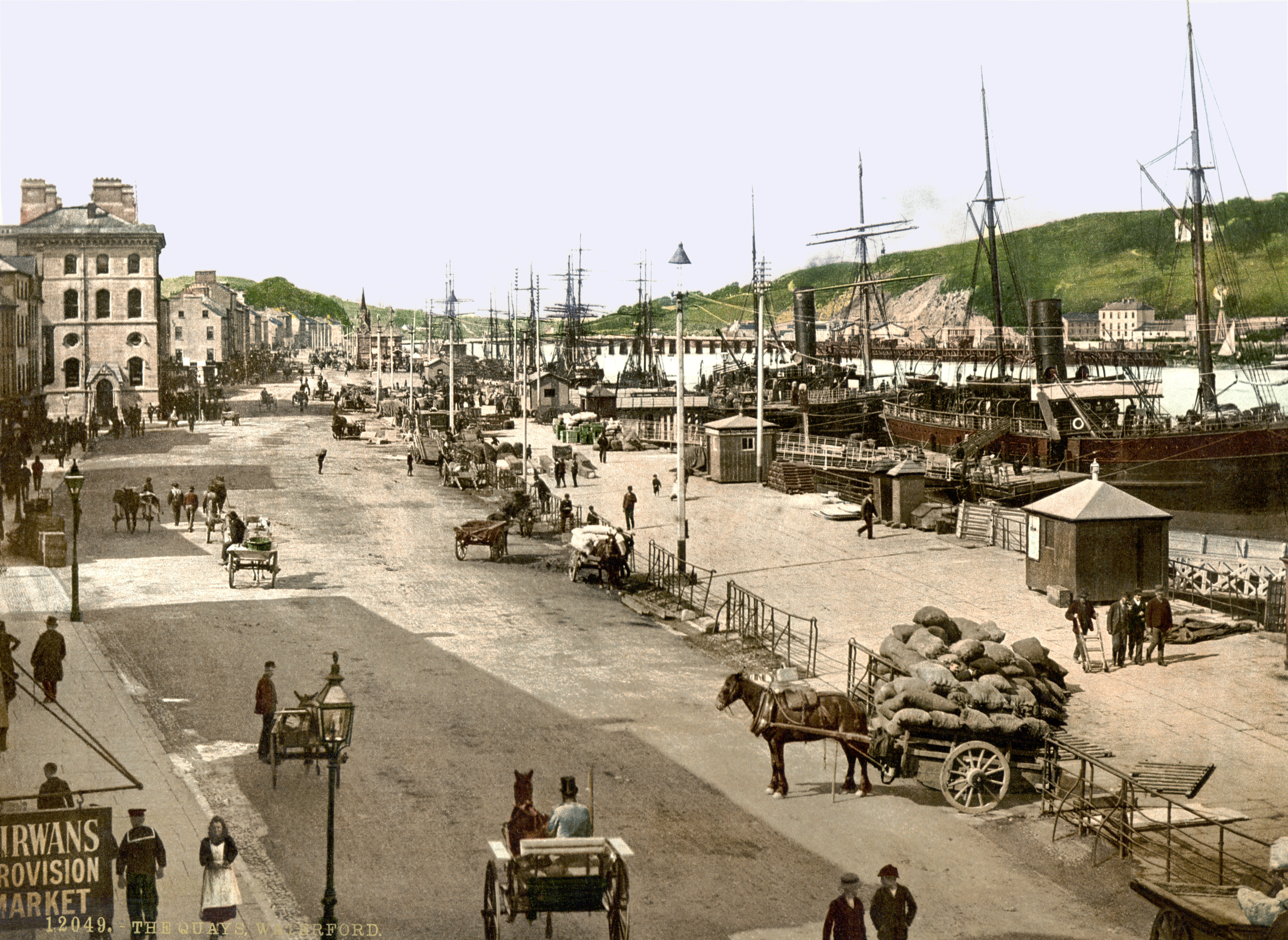
Ships at Waterford circa 1900

Isambard Kingdom Brunel, the GWR's chief engineer, envisaged the railway linking London with the United States of America. He was responsible for designing three large ships, the SS Great Western (1837), SS Great Britain (1843; now preserved at Bristol), and SS Great Eastern (1858). The plans for the transatlantic routes from Bristol failed to materialise but the ships found other uses. Although they were never owned by the Great Western Railway Company, several shareholders and officers of the railway also had interests in the ships.

Great Western Railway (Steam Vessels) Act 1871
- Act of Parliament
- Parliament of the United Kingdom
- Long title: An Act for empowering the Great Western Railway Company to provide and use Steam and other Vessels; and for other purposes.
- Citation: 34 & 35 Vict. c. cxii

Dates
- Royal assent: 13 July 1871

Text of statute as originally enacted

The company's first vessels were two tugs working on the River Dee that were acquired with the Shrewsbury and Chester Railway in 1854. Two years later a service between Neyland in Wales and Waterford in Ireland was established in connection with the railway. This was operated by Ford and Jackson until 1 February 1872 when they were transferred to the railway company under powers obtained by the Great Western Railway (Steam Vessels) Act 1871 (34 & 35 Vict. c. cxii) of 13 July 1871. The act also allowed operation to the Channel Islands and France. These services were eventually provided from Weymouth, although the French services were only operated on a regular basis from 1878 to 1885. After this only cargo services were provided, often on a seasonal basis. The Channel Islands services were operated for the GWR by the Weymouth and Channel Island Steam Packet Company until August 1889 when the railway took on the operation of the route.

Meanwhile, the New Passage Ferry of the River Severn had become a GWR service when the Bristol and South Wales Union Railway was amalgamated in 1868. Another operation taken over by the GWR was the Plymouth Great Western Docks in 1876. The South Devon Railway Company held the majority of shares in the docks and was itself amalgamated with the GWR early in 1876. The docks used a fleet of tenders to land passengers and mails from transatlantic liners moored off-shore; the lighters also operated excursions to coastal towns in Devon and Cornwall. Some cargo services were later operated form Plymouth to Nantes in France. Also in Devon, in 1901 the GWR took over the Dartmouth Passenger Ferry that linked Kingswear railway station with Dartmouth. The GWR also acquired a large shareholding in the West Cornwall Railway which itself owned a part of the West Cornwall Steam Ship Company; GWR ships were occasionally used on its route from Penzance.

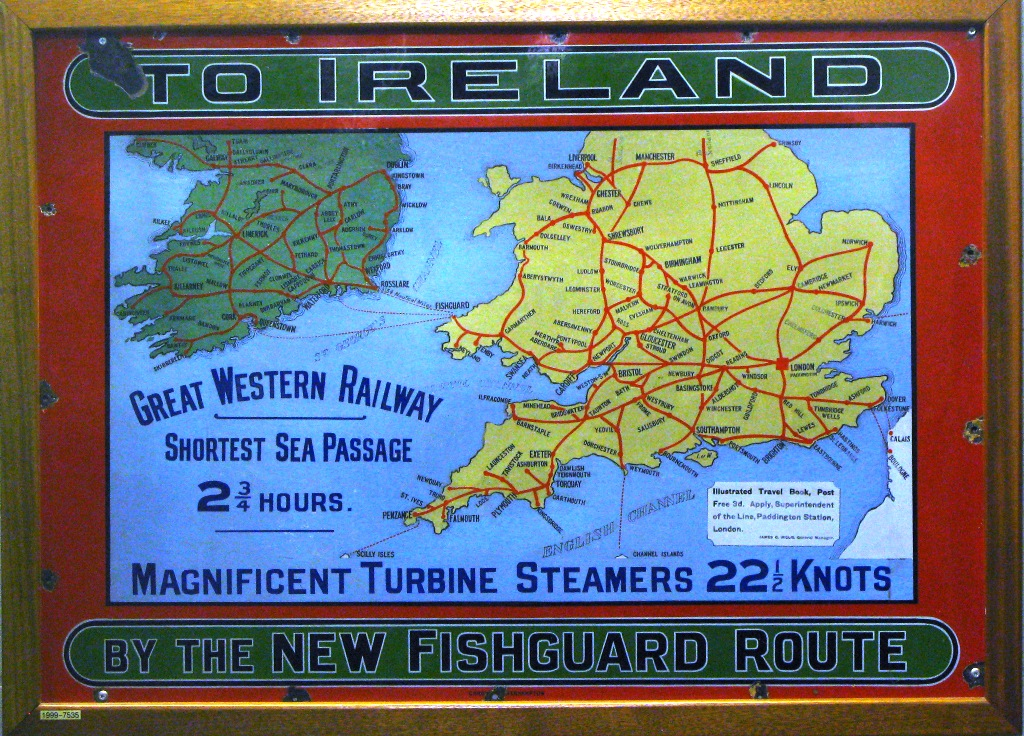
Advertising for the new routes via Fishguard Harbour

On 30 August 1906 the GWR's Welsh terminal was moved to a new harbour at Fishguard. It was hoped that transatlantic liners would also call en route to Liverpool but few did, Liverpool being forsaken for Southampton within a few years but this increased the number of liner calls at Plymouth. A similar change saw Rosslare become the principal railway harbour on the other side of Irish Sea although some services were still provided to Waterford. This work was undertaken in a joint venture with the Great Southern and Western Railway of Ireland known as the Fishguard and Rosslare Railways and Harbours.

Although it had a reputation as the "Great Way Round", the GWR opened several new lines to shorten its traditional main lines to the ports. The Severn Tunnel opened in 1886 to avoid a lengthy detour via Gloucester, although this saw the end of the company's ferry service across the River Severn. Further improvements to the route between London Paddington station and Neyland came in 1903 when the South Wales and Bristol Direct Railway bypassed the congestion around Bristol Temple Meads, and again in 1913 when the Swansea District Lines allowed trains to avoid Swansea. In the meantime, trains to Weymouth had been speeded up following the opening of the Stert and Westbury Railway in 1900, and the special trains carrying passengers and mails off the transatlantic liners at Plymouth used this and the Langport and Castle Cary Railway which opened in 1906.

The Railways Act 1921 brought a number of additional railway companies into the GWR, several of which operated docks and several had small vessels operating in these. The companies concerned were the Barry Railway, Cardiff Railway, Taff Vale Railway, Alexandra (Newport and South Wales) Docks and Railway, Port Talbot Railway and Docks and the Swansea Harbour Trust. The GWR was nationalised on 1 January 1948 to become part of British Railways but the shipping services continued much the same as before for several years.

== Sea-going ships ==
| Ship | Built | Sold/ Scrapped | GRT | Notes |
|---|---|---|---|---|
| TSS Antelope | 1889 | 1913 | 596 | One of three ships built by Lairds of Birkenhead in 1889 for the GWR's newly acquired Channel Island services. She was sold to a Greek owner in 1913, who renamed her Antromitos. |
| TSS Atalanta | 1907 | 1923 | 577 | Built in 1907 for the London and South Western Railway (LSWR), she was sold to the GWR in 1910 when the LSWR stopped providing tender services at Plymouth. She was used by the GWR at both Fishguard and Plymouth. From 1915 to 1919 she was hired by the Admiralty and operated as a rescue tug around the Isles of Scilly, named Atalanta III. She returned to Plymouth after the war but was laid up out of use until sold to the Royal Mail Steam Packet Company in 1923. |
| SS Bretonne | 1893 | 1911 | 1,635 | Formerly the Great Eastern Railway’s Chelmsford. She was purchased in July 1910 to replace the SS Melmore on French cargo services, but those from Weymouth, Dorset were withdrawn at the end of September 1910 and the Bretonne was sold. |
| PS Cheshire | 1863 | 1912 | 387 | A former Mersey ferry, this paddle steamer was added, in 1905, to the fleet of ship's tenders at Plymouth. |
| SS Fishguard | 1908 | 1933 | 2,495 | See St Andrew (1908). |
| PS Gael | 1867 | 1912 | 403 | This paddle steamer was launched in 1867 and spent most of its years in Scotland. She was bought in 1884 and operated by the GWR, mainly on its Weymouth routes but also for a time at Milford Haven and for a short while at Penzance. |
| TSS Gazelle | 1889 | 1925 | 596 | One of three ships built by Lairds of Birkenhead in 1889 for the GWR's newly acquired Channel Island services. In 1907 most of the passenger accommodation was removed and she was then operated on cargo services. She served as a minesweeper in the Mediterranean Sea during World War I and was finally broken up after 36 years service in 1925. |
| TSS Great Southern | 1902 | 1934 | 1,339 | A twin to the Great Western, this ship was intended for the Irish Sea route but also operated from Weymouth. |
| PS Great Western | 1867 | 1891 | 466 | A paddle steamer built for Ford and Jackson in 1867 by William Simons & Co., Renfrew. Not to be confused with Isambard Kingdom Brunel’s SS Great Western of 1837: she was a twin-funnel sister to the South of Ireland. She was acquired in 1872, and like that ship she mainly worked out of Weymouth from 1878 to 1885. Six years later she was sold to David MacBrayne Ltd and sailed on routes off the west coast of Scotland as the Lovedale. |
| TSS Great Western | 1902 | 1933 | 1,339 | The Great Western name was revived after a gap of 11 years for a twin-screw steamer for the Irish Sea ferry service although she also operated at Weymouth for some time. In 1933 she was renamed GWR No. 20 but she was sold for scrap in September that year. |
| TSS Great Western | 1933 | 1966 | 1,726 | The replacement Great Western was built by Cammell Laird as a cargo carrier with limited passenger accommodation. She saw service as a troop ship from April to August 1944 and was finally taken out of service in 1966. |
| PS Helper | 1873 | 1910 | 173 | See Sir Francis Drake (1876). |
| TSS Ibex | 1891 | 1925 | 1,160 | An enlarged version of the three ships launched in 1889, Ibex joined them at Weymouth. She struck the Noirmontaise rocks off Jersey on 16 April 1897 and was beached in Portlet Bay. Less than three years later, on 5 January 1900, she struck a reef at St Peter Port, Guernsey, and sank. One passenger and one crewman died. She was raised on 21 July 1900 and returned to service the following April after repairs. In 1916 a 12-pound gun was mounted on her stern; and on 18 April 1918 she fired on and sank a U-boat for which the crew received a £500 reward. She was cut up at Sharpness in 1925. |
| PS Limerick | 1873 | 1874 | 961 | One of an order for three paddle steamers built by William Simons & Co. of Renfrew in 1873, she was lost very early on and was replaced by a similar ship that was given the same name. Some sources suggest this is the same ship as the PS Limerick of 1874 (see below). |
| PS Limerick | 1874 | 1902 | 961 | A replacement for the 1873 ship of the same name. She was not broken up until 1902. |
| TSS Lynx | 1889 | 1925 | 596 | One of three ships built by Lairds of Birkenhead in 1889 for the GWR's newly acquired Channel Island services. Most of the passenger accommodation was removed in 1910, after which she was operated as a cargo vessel. She served as minesweeper HMS Lynn in the Mediterranean during World War I and was finally broken up after 36 years service. |
| PS Malakhoff | 1851 | 1884 | 699 | This paddle steamer was originally launched in 1851 for the Antwerp Steam Navigation Company as the Baron Osy. She later undertook work for the British government during the Crimean War when she was renamed Malakhoff. She became part of Ford and Jackson's fleet in 1856. She was acquired in 1872 and broken up in 1884. |
| SS Melmore | 1905 | 1912 | 412 | A 13-year old Scottish single-screw cargo ship acquired for services between Weymouth and the Channel islands, and also from Plymouth to Nantes. Her next owner intended to use her for a treasure hunt in the Cocos Islands and she was later registered in Vancouver. |
| PS Milford | 1873 | 1901 | 961 | One of three paddle steamers ordered from William Simons & Co. of Renfrew in 1873; She was badly damaged in a storm and broken up in 1901. |
| SS Pembroke | 1880 | 1925 | 927; 976 (when rebuilt) | This was the first of many ships built for the GWR by Laird's in Birkenhead. She operated as a paddle steamer from 1880 to 1895; the following year returning to service with twin screws and new boilers, all this time on the Irish Sea. In 1916 Pembroke was transferred to work from Weymouth as a cargo boat but on 24 September she was attacked by a U-boat so the following January she was fitted with a gun for defence. She was sold for scrap in 1925. |
| PS Pen Cw | 1912 | 1927 | 168 | A paddle tug for tender operations at Fishguard when the GWR was hoping to attract calls from transatlantic liners. She was sold to a Sunderland owner who renamed her Ingleby Cross but was renamed a second time to Elle when sold on to Scotland. |
| TSS Reindeer | 1897 | 1928 | 1,281 | One of a pair of vessels built by the Naval Construction and Armaments Company in Barrow-in-Furness for the Weymouth fleet in 1897. She operated as a minesweeper in the Mediterranean during World War I and returned to Weymouth afterwards. She was broken up at Briton Ferry. |
| TSS Roebuck | 1897 | 1915 | 1,281 | The second of the vessels added to the Weymouth fleet in 1897 proved unlucky. On 26 January 1905 she caught fire while moored at Milford. The weight of water used to put out the fire caused her to sink but she was raised nine days later and returned to service in June. She ran aground after leaving St Helier on 19 July 1911, refloated on 28 July and returned to service four months later. In 1914 she was converted for minesweeping and renamed HMS Roebuck. On 13 January 1915 she dragged her anchor at Scapa Flow and sank following a collision with HMS Imperieuse, the first railway ship to be lost on war service. |
| TSS Roebuck | 1925 | 1965 | 776 | The old name was revived in 1925 for a new Weymouth-based cargo vessel built by Swan, Hunter and Wigham Richardson on Tyneside; she was followed by the identical Sambur. In 1940 she rescued more than 600 British troops from Dunkirk, after which she was used for war work in the Thames and around northern France for which she was temporarily renamed Roebuck II. She returned to railway service after the war and resumed operation at Weymouth until 27 February 1965; the previous November she had been disguised as the Norwegian SS Galtesund for the film Heroes of Telemark |
| SS Rosslare | 1906 | 1933 | 2,529 | See St David (1906). |
| TrSS St Andrew | 1908 | 1933 | 2,495 | A fourth vessel to operate on the Fishguard service, this one was supplied by John Brown and Company in Scotland and was similar to the ships they had built for the same service in 1906. She was used as a hospital ship during World War I. In 1932 she was renamed Fishguard and sold for scrap the following year. |
| TSS St Andrew | 1932 | 1967 | 2,702 | One of a pair of new vessels built by Cammell Laird for Fishguard services, an improved version of the recent St Patrick. She saw service as a hospital ship during World War II but returned to Fishguard service in 1946 and continued in railway service until 1967 when she was cut up. |
| TrSS St David | 1906 | 1933 | 2,529 | One of three ships that started the new Fishguard to Rosslare service in 1906, St David was built by John Brown. She was used as a hospital ship during World War I. In 1932 she was renamed Rosslare and was sold for scrap the following year. |
| TSS St David | 1932 | 1944 | 2,702 | One of a pair of new vessels built by Cammell Laird for Fishguard services, an improved version of the recent St Patrick. She saw service as a hospital ship during World War II, took part in the Dunkirk evacuation, but was sunk on an operation to Italy in January 1944. |
| TSS St David | 1947 | 1971 | 3,352 | A replacement St David was launched by Cammell Laird in February 1947 and entered service at Fishguard in July. Sold to a Greek owner in 1971, she left British waters carrying the new name Holyhead. |
| TrSS St George | 1906 | 1913 | 2,456 | One of three ships that started the new Fishguard to Rosslare service in 1906, St George was built by Cammell Laird and Company at Birkenhead. She was sold in May 1913 to the Canadian Pacific Railway but six years later was sold again to the Great Eastern Railway for use on their services from Harwich. |
| TSS St Helier | 1925 | 1960 | 1,885 | One of a pair of vessels built by John Brown for the Weymouth services. She had two funnels but one was a dummy and this was removed in 1928. In 1939 she was transferred to Fishguard to replace the St Andrew which was already in government service, but she too was requisitioned by November for troop movements from Southampton. She took part in the evacuation of British troops from Dunkirk and Calais in 1940 following which members of the crew were awarded a Distinguished Service Cross and two Distinguished Service Medals. She then saw government service between Gourock and the Isle of Man. She then moved to Dartmouth to support Motor Torpedo Boats before being converted as an assault ship for the D-Day landings. She then returned to Weymouth for further railway service which lasted until the end of 1960. |
| TSS St Julien | 1925 | 1961 | 1,885 | One of a pair of vessels built by John Brown for the Weymouth services. She had two funnels but one was a dummy and this was removed in 1928. When war broke out in 1939 she was put to use ferrying troops but very quickly converted into a hospital ship. She took part in the evacuation of British troops from Dunkirk and Cherbourg in 1940. She spent the remainder of the war as a hospital ship, including a period operating in the Mediterranean and supporting the D Day landings. Afterwards she returned to Weymouth for further railway service which lasted until 1961. |
| TrSS St Patrick | 1906 | 1930 | 2,531 | One of three ships that started the new Fishguard to Rosslare service in 1906, St Patrick was built by John Brown. She was used as a hospital ship during World War I. She caught fire while moored at Fishguard on 7 April 1929 and was then sold for scrap the following year after her engines had been transferred to St Andrew (1908). |
| SS St Patrick | 1930 | 1941 | 1,922 | A replacement for the fire-wrecked St Patrick of 1906, she was herself sunk with the loss of 30 lives on Friday 13 June 1941 by an air attack near Fishguard. Although registered by the Fishguard and Rosslare Company, she also saw service from Weymouth, where one of her lifeboats was used as a harbour launch for some years after her sinking. |
| TSS St Patrick | 1947 | 1972 | 3,482 | TSS St Patrick (1947) Another replacement St Patrick was launched by Cammell Laird in May 1947 for the Fishguard service but worked from Weymouth from 1948 to 1963 before being transferred to work at Dover and Folkestone. Sold in 1972 to Greece and renamed Thermopylae. |
| TSS Sambur | 1925 | 1964 | 776 | One of a pair of cargo vessels built by Swan, Hunter & Wigham Richardson for Weymouth services. During World War II she carried the name Toreador and worked in the River Thames and the English Channel. She returned to the GWR's Channel Island services in September 1945 and operated until 1964. |
| PS Sir Francis Drake | 1873 | 1910 | 173 | A paddle steamer built for the Plymouth Great Western Docks in 1873 by William Allsup in Preston. In 1908 she was renamed Helper when a new Sir Francis Drake came on station; she was sold to Cosens & Co Ltd of Weymouth in 1910. |
| TSS Sir Francis Drake | 1908 | 1954 | 478 | One of a pair of new twin-screw tenders with an unusually tall funnel for Plymouth built by Cammell Laird. She operated for 46 years both there and at Fishguard. She was hired to the Admiralty as a tug from 1914 to 1919. In August 1939 she was again hired to the Admiralty for use at Plymouth and later at Scapa Flow, returning to the GWR at Plymouth in 1946. She was broken up in Sutton Harbour, Plymouth, in 1954. |
| TSS Sir John Hawkins | 1929 | 1962 | | A coal-fired tender built at Hull for use at Plymouth. On 27 August 1940 she was damaged during an air raid. Following repairs she was taken over by the Royal Navy in January 1941 and saw service at Plymouth, Scapa Flow and Pentland Firth. She was returned to the GWR at Plymouth on 22 November 1945 and remained stationed there until 1962 when she was sold for scrap. |
| TSS Sir Richard Grenville | 1891 | 1976 | | Another tender for Plymouth, similar to the Smeaton but this time built by Lairds of Birkenhead. She was advertised for sale in 1921 but was eventually returned to service until sold in 1931, renamed Penlee then moved on to the Dover Harbour Board where she was renamed a second time to Lady Savile. She was purchased by the Essex Yacht Club in 1947 as their Clubship and moved to Leigh-on-Sea in Essex. She was replaced in 1976 by the Trinity House Pilot cutter Bembridge and was broken up at Queenborough, Sheppey. |
| TSS Sir Richard Grenville | 1931 | 1963 | | A replacement tender was built to the same style as Sir John Hawkins although she was oil-fired and had a shorter funnel. During World War II she was used by the Admiralty at Plymouth, Scapa Flow and Pentland Firth. After returning to railway service early in 1946 she resumed service at Plymouth until 31 October 1963, the last tender in use at that dock. She eventually found a new owner and was renamed La Duchesse de Bretagne for services around the Channel Islands. |
| PS Sir Walter Raleigh | 1876 | 1896 | 151 | This was a small paddle steamer built by William Allsup of Preston for use as a tender at the Plymouth Great Western Docks. She was sold as a tug to a South Shields owner. |
| TSS Sir Walter Raleigh | 1908 | 1968 | 478 | One of a pair of new twin-screw tenders with an unusually tall funnel built by Cammell Laird for use at both Plymouth and Fishguard. She was hired to the Admiralty as a tug from 1914 to 1919. In August 1939 she was again taken on by the Admiralty but operated from Plymouth. She was damaged during an air raid on 15 December 1940 when 8 crew were injured. In 1942 alterations were made to her superstructure for use as a mining tender. She returned to the GWR at the end of 1945 but the following year was sold and found use with various salvage operators until cut up in 1968. |
| SS Smeaton | 1883 | 1947 | 369 | A tender built by William Allsup of Preston for operation at Plymouth. This was the first such vessel to have screw propulsion. She spent a short while working at Fishguard in 1909–10. In 1914 she was hired to the Admiralty as a tug and in 1917 was working for the United States forces at Brest in France. She was laid up when she was returned to the GWR and advertised for sale in 1921 but was eventually returned to service for a few more years until sold to a Belfast owner in 1929 who operated her until cut up in 1947. |
| PS South of Ireland | 1867 | 1883 | 474 | W. Simons of Renfrew built this 200 ton single-funnel paddle steamer for Ford and Jackson in 1867 alongside the Great Western, but from 1878 she was mainly sailing on the Weymouth routes. She was wrecked on the Warbarrow Rocks near Lulworth on a foggy 25 December 1883. |
| PS Thames | 1868 | 1882 | 125 | This paddle steamer was originally built for the London and North Western Railway’s River Mersey services in 1868. She was sold on to the London, Tilbury and Southend Railway after four years with the GWR during which time she operated as part of the Plymouth tender fleet. |
| PS Vulture | 1864 | 1886 | 793 | This paddle steamer was built by J. Aitken in Glasgow in 1864. She became a part of the Ford and Jackson fleet 6 years later and was broken up in 1886. |
| PS Waterford | 1874 | 1905 | 963 | The last of the paddle steamers ordered from William Simons & Co. of Renfrew in 1873. She was in service by June 1874. She was broken up in 1905 although she only carried goods traffic in her last years. |
| TSS Waterford | 1912 | 1924 | 1,204 | A new vessel for the Fishguard to Waterford service, she also sailed occasionally from Weymouth. She was the only one ever owned by the GWR with quadruple-expansion engines. She was sold for further service in the Philippines and renamed Panay. |

== River ferries ==
- Chepstow (1874–1890) 188 tons
  A new paddle steamer was delivered to the New Passage Ferry in 1874. She was made redundant by the new Severn Tunnel railway line at the end of 1886. She was sold to a Cardiff owner who converted her to screw propulsion and renamed her Rover.
- Christopher Thomas (1868–1890) 168 tons
  Named after the company's chairman, this paddle steamer was built for the Bristol and South Wales Union Railway by Henderson, Coulborn and Company at Renfrew in 1854. She was transferred to the GWR when the B&SWUR was amalgamated ten years later, she was redundant after 1886.
- Dolphin (1901–1908) 61 tons
  This paddle steamer had been built in 1869 by Harveys of Hayle for the Kingswear to Dartmouth service and was transferred to the GWR when the railway took on its operation. On 7 March 1902 she conveyed King Edward VII to Dartmouth to lay the foundation stone of the Britannia Royal Naval College. For this duty she was fitted with a carpet, curtains, a table and upholstered chairs.
- Ferry No. 2 (1922–1947) 8 tons
  A small ferry used on Bute Docks at Cardiff, acquired with the Cardiff Railway.
- Ilton Castle (1927 – ca.1930) 53 tons
  Originally built in 1906, this paddle steamer came to the GWR from March and Southwood of Salcombe and was used for excursions from Salcombe.
- Kenwith Castle (1927–1932) 53 tons
  Built in 1914 for the Kingsbridge ferry, this paddle steamer came to the GWR from March and Southwood of Salcombe and was used for excursions from Salcombe. She was sold to the Tamar Transport Company who sold her in 1935 to the Millbrook Steamboat and Trading Company at Plymouth who operated her on the Millbrook Ferry as the Whitsand Castle.
- The Mew (1908–1947) 117 tons
  A replacement vessel for the Dartmouth ferry, she was built at Falmouth and was a familiar sight on the service for 47 years until withdrawn by British Railways on 8 October 1954.

== Tugs and work boats ==
=== A to M ===
- Archibald Hood (1922–1947) 164 tons
  A Barry Railway tug, built in 1898 at Falmouth, she served with British Railways until 1950.
- Armine (1899–1936) 7 tons
  A small, Cowes-built 13-year-old launch added to the Weymouth fleet in 1899. She was mainly used to move coaling barges around the harbour but held a certificate for 12 passengers. The last coal-fired vessel at Weymouth, the Great Western (1902) left in 1932 and the Armine was sold in September 1936 for conversion to a motor boat.
- Baron Glanely (1946–1947)
  See Lord Glanely.
- Basingstoke (1920 - ?) 402 tons
  A double-grab excavator-dredger purchased from the London and South Western Railway.
- Beaufort (1923 – ?) 119 tons
  A former Swansea Harbour Trustees vessel.
- Bruce (1922 - ?) 141 tons
  A dredger at Alexandra Docks, Newport.
- Cardiff (1940–47) 181 tons.
  Launched as Foremost 97. To British Railways, Sold 1963, scrapped 1964.
- Clevedon (1876–1886) 167 tons
  A paddle steamer used around Bristol by the Bristol and Exeter Railway from 1875.
- Cymro (1854 – ca.1881) 70 tons
  A wooden paddle tug acquired with the Shrewsbury and Chester Railway. She was launched in 1826 and taken out of service sometime after 1878.
- David Davies (1925–1947) 962 tons
  A bucket dredger for Barry Docks.
- Don Frederico (1923–1947) 481 tons
  A Swansea Harbour Trustees dredger.
- The Earl (1922 – ca. 1931) 101 tons
  A former Cardiff Railway tug.
- The Earl (1931–1947) 148 tons
  A replacement tug for Cardiff.
- Emily Charlotte (1922–1933) 122 tons
  A tug acquired with Port Talbot docks.
- Foremost 27 (1925–1947) 512 tons
  A self-powered hopper barge used at Cardiff Docks.
- Francis Gilbertson (1928–1947) 275 tons
  A grab dredger used at Bristol Channel ports.
- Horace (1922–1947) 141 tons
  A tug at Alexandra Docks, Newport.
- Lady Tredegar (1922–1947) 105 tons
  A tug at Alexandra Docks, Newport.
- Lord Glanely (1927–1946) 156 tons
  A tug for use at Cardiff, she was renamed Baron Glanely on his lordship's elevation in 1946.
- Manxman (1891 – ca.1897) 56 tons
  A tug for the River Dee at Chester, built at Middlesbrough by R Craggs and Son.
- Mudeford (1924–1947) 232 tons
  A grab dredger for Cardiff docks.

=== N to Z ===
- Palmerston (1883 - ?) 109 tons
  Originally built in 1864, she was purchased from the Dover Harbour Board and normally worked in West Wales.
- Porteur No. 5 (1899 – ?)
  A small ship for the Fishguard and Rosslare works.
- Robert Vassall (1922–1947) 317 tons
  A bucket-dredger acquired with the Taff Vale Railway.
- St Baruch (1922–1947) 177 tons
  A tug built at Falmouth in 1916 for the Barry Railway.
- Sir Ernest Palmer (1924–1947) 753 tons
  A self-powered hopper barge used at Cardiff Docks.
- Sir Henry Mather Jackson (1924–1947) 735 tons
  A self-powered hopper barge used at Cardiff Docks.
- Sir John R. Wright (1921–1938) 95 tons
  A tug stationed at Fishguard.
- Swansea (1923–1947) 147 tons
  A former Swansea Harbour Trustees tug.
- Taff (1946–47)
  A hopper dredger. To British Transport Commission 1948. Deleted from shipping registers in 1955 but still extant in 1969.
- Test (1854 – ?)
  A wooden paddle tug acquired with the Shrewsbury and Chester Railway in 1854; she was withdrawn from service in the 1880s.
- Thames (1886–1903) 103 tons
  This tug was twenty years old when she came into Great Western ownership.
- Trusty (1923–1947) 148 tons
  A former Swansea Harbour Trustees tug.
- Viscount Churchill (1924–1947) 735 tons
  A self-powered hopper barge used at Cardiff Docks.
- Voltaic (1896–1900) 580 tons
  Built in 1867, this steamer was the first owned by the Fishguard and Rosslare Harbours and Railways Company and was employed by them on a service from Bristol to Wexford.
- Weston (1876–1885) 166 tons
  A paddle steamer built for the Bristol and Exeter Railway in 1875 for use around Bristol.
- Windsor (1932–1947) 150 tons
  A tug for use at Barry Docks.

== Liveries ==
Hulls were painted black with red below the waterline; from 1889 to 1914 there was a white band at main deck level. Paddle-boxes and upper works were buff coloured, funnel red, and the company's coat of arms was carried on the bow. Fishguard and Rosslare vessels were similar but had brown, later white, upper works. The flag was white with narrow red bands at top and bottom.

== See also ==
- Irish Mercantile Marine during World War II
