= St Helier (disambiguation) =

St Helier is a parish in the island of Jersey named after Saint Helier. Other places named after the saint are:

- St. Helier, London - a suburb in the London Boroughs of Merton and Sutton
  - St Helier (Merton ward) - an electoral ward of Merton London Borough Council created in 1978
  - St Helier (Sutton ward) - an electoral ward of Sutton London Borough Council created in 1978
  - St Helier East (ward) - an electoral ward of Sutton London Borough Council created in 2022
  - St Helier West (ward) - an electoral ward of Sutton London Borough Council created in 2022
- St Helier railway station - a railway station in the suburb of the same name in London
- St Heliers Correctional Centre - a prison in New South Wales, Australia
- Saint-Hélier, Côte-d'Or - a commune of eastern France
- Saint Heliers - a suburb of Auckland
- Saint Heliers, Melbourne - a part of the suburb of Abbotsford
- TSS St Helier

== See also ==
- Saint-Hellier - a commune in Haute-Normandie
