= Richard Grenville (disambiguation) =

Sir Richard Grenville (1542–1591) was an English sailor and soldier.

Richard Grenville may also refer to:

== People ==
=== Grenville of Devon and Cornwall ===
- Richard de Grenville (died after 1142), one of the Twelve Knights of Glamorgan
- Richard Grenville (died 1550), MP for Cornwall in 1529
- Richard Grenville (died 1577 or 1578), MP for Newport (Cornwall) and Dunheved
- Sir Richard Grenville, 1st Baronet (1600–1658), Royalist leader in the English Civil War

=== Grenville of Buckinghamshire ===
- Richard Grenville (1678–1727), British politician, Member of Parliament (MP) for Buckingham and Wendover
- Richard Grenville-Temple, 2nd Earl Temple (1711–1779), British politician, MP for Buckingham and Buckinghamshire
- Richard Grenville (British Army officer) (1742–1823), British Army general

=== Other people ===
- Richard Grenville Verney, 19th Baron Willoughby de Broke (1869–1923), British peer and politician, MP for Rugby

== Other uses ==
- Sir Richard Grenville, a GWR 3031 Class locomotive
- TSS Sir Richard Grenville (1891), a passenger tender vessel built for the Great Western Railway
  - TSS Sir Richard Grenville (1931)

== See also ==
- Grenville (disambiguation)
- Richard Temple-Nugent-Brydges-Chandos-Grenville (disambiguation)
