= St David (ship) =

St David is the name of the following ships, named for St David:

- HMS St David, ships of the Royal Navy
- TrSS St David, launched in 1906, scrapped in 1933
- TSS St David (1931), sunk in 1944
- TSS St David (1947), scrapped in 1979

== See also ==
- St David (disambiguation)
