= List of ships named SS Great Western =

A number of ships have carried the name Great Western.

- SS Great Western (1838), built for the Great Western Steamship Company. Sold to Royal Mail Steam Packet Company in 1846. Served as a troopship during the Crimean War and scrapped in 1856.
- PS Great Western (1867), built for Ford and Jackson, but used by the Great Western Railway from 1872 to 1890.
- SS Great Western (1872), built for M. Whitwill & Son, Bristol. Wrecked in 1876.
- PS Great Western (1876), built for W. & T. Joliffe. Lost in a collision 1898
- TSS Great Western (1901), built for the Great Western Railway. Renamed G.W.R. 20 in 1933 and scrapped in 1934.
- TSS Great Western (1933), built for the Great Western Railway. Scrapped in 1966 by British Rail.
