= TrSS St Andrew =

History
- Name: 1908–1932: TrSS St Andrew; 1932–1933: TrSS Fishguard
- Operator: 1908–1933: Great Western Railway
- Port of registry: (United Kingdom)
- Builder: John Brown, Clydebank
- Yard number: 382
- Launched: 1908
- Out of service: 1933
- Fate: Scrapped September 1933

General characteristics
- Tonnage: 2,528 gross register tons (GRT)
- Length: 351.1 feet (107.0 m)
- Beam: 41.1 feet (12.5 m)
- Propulsion: 3 direct drive steam turbines
- Speed: 20 kts

TrSS St Andrew was a passenger vessel built for the Great Western Railway in 1908.

== History ==
TrSS St Andrew was built by John Brown to augment the three new ships of 1906, the TrSS St David, TrSS St George and the TrSS St Patrick acquired for the Fishguard to Rosslare service.

In 1910 she was in a heavy sea on a voyage between Fishguard and Douglas, and a member of crew, Thomas O’Neill of Waterford was thrown overboard and drowned.

During the First World War she was used as a hospital ship. In 1932 she was renamed Fishguard, to free up her name for a replacement TSS St Andrew, and was scrapped in 1933.
