= Melmore =

Melmore may refer to:

- Melmore, Ohio, census-designated place in Ohio, United States
- SS Melmore (1892), passenger cargo vessel operated by the Great Western Railway from 1905 to 1912
- Natalie Melmore, English lawn bowler
