= Saint David Parish =

Saint David Parish may refer to:

- Saint David Parish, Dominica
- Saint David Parish, Grenada
- Saint David Parish, Jamaica
- Saint David Parish, Saint Vincent and the Grenadines
- Saint David (Tobago), Tobago
- Saint David Parish, New Brunswick

== See also ==
- Saint David (disambiguation)
