= List of shipwrecks in June 1890 =

The list of shipwrecks in June 1890 includes ships sunk, foundered, grounded, or otherwise lost during June 1890.

== 2 June ==
List of shipwrecks: 2 June 1890
Ship	State	Description
Creole	United Kingdom	The yacht collided with a markboat and sank off Dover, Kent.
Neptune	United Kingdom	The steamship was driven ashore at Bembridge, Isle of Wight.

== 3 June ==
List of shipwrecks: 3 June 1890
Ship	State	Description
Lizzie Burrill	Dominion of Canada	The ship ran aground on the Danger Patch, in the Irish Sea off the coast of Lancashire, United Kingdom. She was on a voyage from Saint John, New Brunswick to Fleetwood, Lancashire. She was refloated.
Thursby	United Kingdom	The steamship ran aground in the Seine. She was refloated.
W. C. Westmore	United States	The steam barge was destroyed by fire in Lake Erie. She was on a voyage from Cleveland, Ohio to Chicago, Illinois.

== 4 June ==
List of shipwrecks: 4 June 1890
Ship	State	Description
Aalesund	Norway	The barque collided with the barque Urda (Norway) and sank off Penarth, Glamorgan, United Kingdom. Her nine crew were rescued. Aalesund was on a voyage from Cardiff, Glamorgan to Farsund.
Belle	United Kingdom	The fishing boat collided with the fishing boat Zanthe (United Kingdom) and sank in the English Channel 15 nautical miles (28 km) south west of The Lizard, Cornwall. Her crew were rescued by the barque Solide (Germany). Her crew were rescued.
Grace	United Kingdom	The ketch was driven ashore at Anstruther, Fife.
Scale Force	United Kingdom	The steamship ran aground at Harrington, Cumberland. She was on a voyage from Douglas, Isle of Man to Harringto. She was refloated the next day with the assistance of a number of tugs.
Vale	Norway	The steamship was driven ashore at Vyborg, Russia.
Vooruitgang	Belgium	The steamship collided with a bridge at Terneuzen, Zeeland, Netherlands and sank. She was on a voyage from Antwerp to Ghent, East Flanders.

== 5 June ==
List of shipwrecks: 5 June 1890
Ship	State	Description
Josephine	Belgium	The tug collided with the steamship Elberfield (Germany) and sank in the Scheldt.
Marcia	United Kingdom	The steamship was driven ashore at "Kalkboden", Grand Duchy of Finland. Her crew were rescued.
Wilson G. Hunt	Dominion of Canada	The steamship was destroyed by fire at Victoria, British Columbia.

== 6 June ==
List of shipwrecks: 6 June 1890
Ship	State	Description
Carpathian	United Kingdom	The ship ran aground on the Courland Bank, off Queenstown, County Cork. She was on a voyage from Port Augusta, South Australia to Le Havre, Seine-Inférieure, France. She was refloated with the assistance of a number of tugs and resumed her voyage.
Hans und Kurt	Germany	The steamship caught fire and was severely damaged at Philadelphia, Pennsylvania, United States.
Essex	United Kingdom	The steamship collided with the steamship Mokta (France) and sank in the Atlantic Ocean. Her crew were rescued. Essex was on a voyage from "Cheriban" to Liverpool, Lancashire.
Manuela	Spain	The steamship foundered near Cabo da Roca, Portugal. All on board were rescued. She was on a voyage from Vigo to Cádiz.
Nena	United States	The steamship was wrecked in the Mississippi River.
Prince Imperial	United Kingdom	The paddle tug collided with the passenger ship Carnation at London and was severely damaged.

== 8 June ==
List of shipwrecks: 8 June 1890
Ship	State	Description
City of Rome	United Kingdom	The steamship struck the Fastnet Rock. She was on a voyage from New York, United States to Queenstown, County Cork. She was refloated and resumed her voyage.

== 10 June ==
List of shipwrecks: 10 June 1890
Ship	State	Description
Allegro	Flag unknown	The ship ran aground. She was on a voyage from South Shields, County Durham, United Kingdom to "Middelfahrough". She was refloated with assistance and taken under tow.
Antelope	United Kingdom	The steamship ran aground on the Cavale Rock, off Guernsey, Channel Islands. She was refloated and taken in to Guernsey.
Taurus	France	The steamship was damaged by fire at Marseille, Bouches-du-Rhône.

== 11 June ==
List of shipwrecks: 11 June 1890
Ship	State	Description
West Cumberland	United Kingdom	The steamship collided with the barque Minero (United Kingdom) and sankin the Atlantic Ocean 60 nautical miles (110 km) north of Cape Finisterre, Spain. Her seventeen crew were rescued b y Minero an dthe steamship Mounts Bay (United Kingdom). West Cumberland was on a voyage from Cartagena, Spain to Mostyn, Flintshire.

== 12 June ==
List of shipwrecks: 12 June 1890
Ship	State	Description
Gracia	Norway	The whaler, a steamship, was holed by a whale and sank 8 nautical miles (15 km) off "Sorean" / off the Varangerfjord.

== 13 June ==
List of shipwrecks: 13 June 1890
Ship	State	Description
Yangtsze	Germany	The steamship was wrecked on "Hiessan Island", China. All on board were rescued.

== 14 June ==
List of shipwrecks: 14 June 1890
Ship	State	Description
Armorique	France	The steamship ran aground at Penmarc'h, Finistère. She was on a voyage from Pasajes, Spain to Rouen, Seine-Inférieure, France. She was a total loss.
Eva	United Kingdom	The ship collided with the steamship Sea Flower (United Kingdom) and sak in the River Avon. Her crew survived. She was later refloated.
Lisiris	Belgium	The steamship ran aground on the coast of Cornwall, United Kingdom. She was refloated and completed her voyage to Antwerp.
Thomas Owen	United Kingdom	The schooner was wrecked on the Haisborough Sands, in the North Sea off the coast of Norfolk with the loss of her captain. She was on a voyage from Frederiksberg, Denmark to London.

== 15 June ==
List of shipwrecks: 15 June 1890
Ship	State	Description
Ada Maria	United Kingdom	The ship sprang a leak and was beached north of Avonmouth, Somerset. She was on a voyage from Cardiff, Glamorgan to Avonmouth.
Argyle	United Kingdom	The steamship ran aground on the Middle Sandbank, in the North Sea off the coast of Forfarshire. She was refloated.
Dai San Seiko Maru	Japan	The ship heeled over and sank on being launched at Osaka with the loss of 55 lives.
Elbe	United Kingdom	The steamship struck rocks at The Lizard, Cornwall and was damaged. She was on a voyage from London to Cardiff, Glamorgan. She put in to Falmouth, Cornwall.
Emilie	Flag unknown	The schooner ran aground at Terneuzen, South Holland, Netherlands. She was refloated with the assistance of a tug.

== 16 June ==
List of shipwrecks: 16 June 1890
Ship	State	Description
Hermine	United Kingdom	The barque struck a rock near Rhoscolyn, Anglsey. She capsized and sank. Her crew were rescued. She was on a voyage from Supe, Peru to Liverpool, Lancashire.
Jarl	Norway	The steamship ran aground at Saltholm, Denmark. She was on a voyage from Stornaway, Isle of Lewis, United Kingdom to Stettin, Germany. She was refloated with the assistance of a steamship and resumed her voyage.
Lillie	United Kingdom	The steamship ran aground at Saltholm. She was on a voyage from Middlesbrough, Yorkshire to Stettin. She was refloated and resumed her voyage.
Walney	United Kingdom	The steamship ran aground in the Carlingford Lough.
Yon Yangs	New South Wales	The steamship was wrecked at Willoughby. Some of her crew were reported missing. She was on a voyage from Port Pirie, South Australia to Sydney.

== 17 June ==
List of shipwrecks: 17 June 1890
Ship	State	Description
Lizzie	United Kingdom	The smack sank off the Isle of Arran. Her crew were rescued.

== 18 June ==
List of shipwrecks: 18 June 1890
Ship	State	Description
Curlew	United Kingdom	The steamship sank at Invergordon, Ross-shire.
Plymouth	United Kingdom	The brig was driven ashore in the Saint Lawrence River downstream of Montreal, Quebec, Dominion of Canada. She was on a voyage from Montreal to a port in the Newfoundland Colony. She was refloated and towed in to Montreal in a severely damaged condition.
Vulcan	United Kingdom	The steamship was driven ashore in Aberlady Bay. She was later refloated and taken in tow for Leith, Lothian.

== 19 June ==
List of shipwrecks: 19 June 1890
Ship	State	Description
Electra	United Kingdom	The ship ran aground near Fécamp, Seine-Inférieure, France. She was refloated.
Galtee	United Kingdom	The steamship ran aground in the River Ouse near Goole, Yorkshire. She was on a voyage from Goole to Ghent, East Flanders, Belgium. She was refloated and resumed her voyage.
Kite	United Kingdom	The steamship was driven ashore in Lingan Bay, Nova Scotia, Dominion of Canada.
Moorish Prince	United Kingdom	The steamship ran ashore on Sant Andres Island, Italy.

== 20 June ==
List of shipwrecks: 20 June 1890
Ship	State	Description
Duke of Leicester	United Kingdom	The steamship was run into by the steamship Stanley at Greenock, Renfrewshire and was severely damaged.

== 21 June ==
List of shipwrecks: 21 June 1890
Ship	State	Description
Annie Burrell	United Kingdom	The full-rigged ship ran aground in the River Laggan. She was on a voyage from Saint John, New Brunswick, Dominion of Canada to Belfast, County Antrim.
Batavia	Netherlands	The steamship ran aground in the River Thames. She was refloated and resumed her voyage.
Doris	Flag unknown	The ship ran aground at Port-de-Bouc, Bouches-du-Rhône, France. She was on a voyage from Philadelphia, Pennsylvania, United States to Port-de-Bouc. She was refloated and found to be leaky.
Ellen	United Kingdom	The brig was driven ashore on Gotland, Sweden. Her crew survived. She was on a voyage from Boulogne, Pas-de-Calais, France to Sundsvall, Sweden.
Jeffrey	United Kingdom	The schooner was driven ashore at Breaksea Point, Glamorgan. She was refloated and towed in to Cardiff, Glamorgan.
Thornhill	United Kingdom	The steamship collided with the steamship Lotus (United Kingdom) and foundered off Folkestone, Kent. Her 21 crew were rescued. Thornhill was on a voyage from Blyth, Northumberland to Torre Annunziata, Italy.

== 23 June ==
List of shipwrecks: 23 June 1890
Ship	State	Description
Bygdo	United Kingdom	The steamship ran aground at Boston, Lincolnshire, United Kingdom. She was on a voyage from Alexandria, Egypt to Boston. She was refloated the next day.
George Clarkson	United Kingdom	The steamship was driven ashore at North Sydney, Nova Scotia, Dominion of Canada. She was refloated with the assistance of a number of tugs.
James	United Kingdom	The ship ran aground in the River Mersey at the entrance to the Widnes Canal.
Mereo	Germany	The steamship was driven ashore at Cape Lazarev, Russia. She was on a voyage from Vladivostock, Russia to Hamburg.
North Star	United Kingdom	The schooner ran aground at Hopeman, Morayshire. She was severely damaged.
Redewater	United Kingdom	The steamship collided with the steamship Marquis de Mudela (Flag unknown) in the River Tyne and was beached.
Scheldt	United Kingdom	The steamship was driven ashore at Pendeen, Cornwall. Her crew landed at Pendeen Cove.. She was on a voyage from Newport, Monmouthshire to Bordeaux, Gironde, France.
Vulcan	United Kingdom	The steamship sprang a leak and sank in the Firth of Forth. Her crew were rescued. She was under tow from Aberlady Bay to Leith, Lothian.
Zeraobia	United Kingdom	The ship ran aground at Goole. She was on a voyage from Rosario, Argentina to Goole. She was refloated and taken in to Goole.

== 24 June ==
List of shipwrecks: 24 June 1890
Ship	State	Description
Alice D. Crewe	United States	The steamship exploded at Red Hook, Brooklyn, New York with the loss of three live.
Bala	United Kingdom	The steamship was driven ashore on the Bosphorus at Candilli, Ottoman Empire. She was refloated.
Ethel	United Kingdom	The barque collided with the steamship Umbilo (United Kingdom) 20 nautical miles (37 km) south west of the Isle of Portland, Dorset and sank with the loss of five of the 23 people on board. Ethel was on a voyage from London to Brisbane, Queensland.
George Williams	United Kingdom	The schooner was driven ashore at Crowlink, Sussex.
Henry	United Kingdom	The barge sprang a leak and sank in the River Thames.
Lima Rock	United States	The scow was wrecked by the explosion of Alice D. Crew (United States) at Red Hook.
Sardonyx	United Kingdom	The steamship was lost off Queen Charlotte Island, British Columbia, Dominion of Canada. Her crew were rescued.

== 25 June ==
List of shipwrecks: 25 June 1890
Ship	State	Description
Daring	United Kingdom	The fishing boat was driven ashore in Weyland Bay, Orkney Islands.
Falls of Garry	United Kingdom	The full-rigged ship ran aground at Montrose, Forfarshire. She was on a voyage from Dundee to Montrose. She was refloated with assistance.
Hannah	United Kingdom	The fishing boat was driven ashore and wrecked at Workington, Cumberland with the loss of both crew.
Invincible	United Kingdom	The fishing boat was wrecked near Thurso, Caithness. Her crew survived.
Mary Ann	United Kingdom	The fishing boat was driven ashore near Harrington, Cumberland with the loss of one of her two crew.
Mazeppa	United Kingdom	The brig was run down and sunk in the English Channel off Start Point, Devon by the steamship Opah (United Kingdom). Her crew were rescued by Opah. Mazeppa was on a voyage from South Shields, County Durham to Kingstown, County Dublin.
Nicholas Mullany	United Kingdom	The smack was driven ashore in Bullen Bay. She was on a voyage from Youghal, County Cork to Ross.
Prins Frederick	Netherlands	The steamship sank after it was hit midships by the steamship Marpessa (United Kingdom) in the English Channel. Seven soldiers died; the remaining 170 crew, soldiers and passengers were landed at Falmouth, Cornwall. Prins Frederick was on a voyage from Southampton, Hampshire, United Kingdom to Java, Netherland East Indies.
Triumph	United Kingdom	The fishing boat was presumed to have foundered with the loss of all six crew.
SY.420	United Kingdom	The fishing boat was reported missing, feared lost with all hands.
WK.149	United Kingdom	The fishing boat was wrecked near Thurso. Her crew survived.
WK.242	United Kingdom	The fishing boat was wrecked near Sandwick Orkney Islands with the loss of all hands.
WK.866	United Kingdom	The fishing boat was driven ashore at Longhope, Orkney Islands with the loss of all hands.
1,450	United Kingdom	The fishing boat was driven ashore in the Bay of Skaill, Orkney Islands. Her crew were rescued.
Unnamed	United Kingdom	The fishing boat was wrecked near Portsoy, Aberdeenshire. Her crew survived.
Unnamed	United Kingdom	The fishing boat was driven ashore on Shapinsay, Orkney Islands. She was refloated.
Unnamed	United Kingdom	The fishing boat was driven ashore in Kirkwall Bay.
Unnamed	United Kingdom	The fishing boat was wrecked at Stoer Head, Sutherland.
Six fishing vessels	United Kingdom	Gales in the Orkneys caused the loss of six fishing boats and 40 lives. Others are missing.
Eleven fishing boats	United Kingdom	The fishing boats were wrecked in the Solway Firth with the loss of four lives.
Unnamed	United Kingdom	The fishing boat was wrecked at Stromness, Orkney Islands. Her crew were rescued.
Two unnamed vessels	United Kingdom	The fishing boats were wrecked at the mouth of the River Thurso. Their crew survived.
Unnamed	United Kingdom	The fishing boat was wrecked in Murkle Bay, Caithness. Her crew survived.
Unnamed	United Kingdom	The fishing boat was driven ashore and wrecked on Ronsay, Orkney Islands.
Two unnamed vessels	United Kingdom	The fishing boats were driven ashore and wrecked at Brezlete, Isle of Lewis.
Unnamed	United Kingdom	The fishing boat was driven ashore near Sandwick.

== 26 June ==
List of shipwrecks: 26 June 1890
Ship	State	Description
Crusoe	United Kingdom	The yawl was driven into by the fishing boat Maggie Phimister (United Kingdom) at Stornoway, Isle of Lewis and was severely damaged.

== 27 June ==
List of shipwrecks: 27 June 1890
Ship	State	Description
Nelson	Flag unknown	The ship ran aground on the Porpoise Rock, off Launceston, Tasmania. She was on a voyage from Melbourne, Victoria to Launceston. She floated off the next day and sank.
Thames	United Kingdom	The steamship struck the pier and ran aground at Ouistreham, Calvados, France. She was on a voyage from Swansea, Glamorgan to Caen, Calvados. She was refloated and completed her voyage.

== 28 June ==
List of shipwrecks: 28 June 1890
Ship	State	Description
Bella, or Beta	United Kingdom	The schooner collided with the steamship Chatworth (United Kingdom) and foundered in the Bristol Channel off Lavernock Point, Cornwall. Her crew were rescued by Chatworth. The schooner was on a voyage from Bristol, Gloucestershire to Porthcawl, Glamorgan.
Merope	United Kingdom	The clipper caught fire at sea. Her eighteen crew were rescued by Servia (United States). Merope was on a voyage from Wellington, New Zealand to London.
Norman Prince	United Kingdom	The steamship ran aground at Bilbao, Spain. She was refloated and put back to Bilbao in a sinking condition.
Raleigh	United Kingdom	The steamship ran aground at Wismar, Germany.

== 29 June ==
List of shipwrecks: 29 June 1890
Ship	State	Description
Alice E. Crowe and Lima Rock	United Kingdom; United States	The ship Alice E. Crowe exploded and was destroyed at Erie Basin, New York with the loss of three lives. The scow Lima Rock was also destroyed.
Dunluce	United Kingdom	The steamship was driven ashore at the Häradskär Lighthouse, Sweden Her crew were rescued.
Idaho	United States	The steamship ran aground in The Swash. She was on a voyage from Avonmouth, Somerset, United Kingdom to Montreal, Quebec, Dominion of Canada. She was refloated and resumed her voyage.
New Guinea	United Kingdom	The steamship was driven ashore at "Tanjong Tashon". She was refloated. She was on a voyage from Singapore to London.
Unnamed	United Kingdom	The yacht was driven ashore at Colintraive, Argyllshire.

== 30 June ==
List of shipwrecks: 30 June 1890
Ship	State	Description
Oscar	United Kingdom	The ship was wrecked at Lagos, Lagos Colony with some loss of life.
Royal Briton, and Thule	United Kingdom; Norway	The tug Royal Briton and the steamship Thule collided at Cardiff, Glamorgan and were both severely damaged at the bows.
Southella	United Kingdom	The steamship collided with the dock gates at Grimsby, Lincolnshire and became severely leaky.

== Unknown date ==
List of shipwrecks: unknown date in June 1890
Ship	State	Description
Agnes	United Kingdom	The barque ran aground in the Douro between 23 and 25 June. She was on a voyage from Porto, Portugal to Rio de Janeiro, Brazil. She was refloated and resumed her voyage.
Arlon	Germany	The steamship ran aground at Dragør, Denmark. She was on a voyage from Riga, Russia to the Weser. She was later refloated and resumed her voyage.
Benguela	United Kingdom	The steamship was abandoned in the Atlantic Ocean before 24 June. She was on a voyage from New York, United States to Lisbon, Portugal.
Cabo Gata	Spain	The steamship was wrecked at Viana do Castelo, Portugal. Her crew were rescued She was on a voyage from Huelva to Vigo.
Columba	Norway	The barque was wrecked on the coast of the Natal Colony.
Domenico M.	Italy	The barque was wrecked in the Chandeleur Islands, Louisiana, United States. She was on a voyage from Pensacola, Florida, United States to Genoa.
Elmfield	United Kingdom	The steamship was driven ashore at Pensacola. She was later refloated with assistance and put into Pensacola.
Femer	Norway	The barque foundered in the Atlantic Ocean 300 nautical miles (560 km) west of Ireland. Her fifteen crew were rescued by the barque Falken (Norway). Femer was on a voyage from Liverpool, Lancashire, United Kingdom to Halifax, Nova Scotia, Dominion of Canada.
Gota Kanal I	Uruguay	The steamship was driven ashore at Bella Vista, Argentina.
Helvoet	Flag unknown	The brig was driven ashore at Whitgift, Yorkshire, United Kingdom. She was refloated on 21 June and beached at Hull, Yorkshire.
Henry Anning	United Kingdom	The steamship ran aground at Bordeaux, Gironde, France. She was refloated on 28 June.
Ida	Netherlands	The barque foundered at sea on or before 21 June. Her crew survived She was on a voyage from Burntisland, Fife, United Kingdom to Riga, Russia.
Lady Eva	United Kingdom	The steam launch was destroyed by fire at Ditton, Surrey.
Langoe	United Kingdom	The steamship was driven ashore near the Söderarm Lighthouse, Sweden. She was refloated and taken in to Stockholm in a leaky condition.
Louis	Norway	The barque was abandoned in the Atlantic Ocean before 2 June. Her crew were rescued. She was on a voyage from Ostend, West Flanders, Belgium to Sydney, Nova Scotia.
Louis Bucki	United States	The steamship was destroyed by fire at sea. Her crew were rescued by the steamship Saint Ronans (United Kingdom).
Martha	Germany	The steamship ran aground on the Anegada Reef, Virgin Islands. She was on a voyage from Hamburg to Vera Cruz, Mexico. She was later refloate.
Meteor	Norway	The barque foundered in the Atlantic Ocean. Her crew survived.
Middleton	United Kingdom	The brig ran aground in the River Ouse. She was refloated on 22 June and beached at Hull, Yorkshire.
Monarch	United Kingdom	The steamship ran aground at Pensacola. She was later refloated.
Olive Branch	United Kingdom	The brigantine was wrecked at Saint Lucia. Her crew were rescued.
Romolo	Brazil	The schooner foundered in the Atlantic Ocean. Her crew survived.
Saga	Sweden	The steamship was driven ashore. She was later refloated and put in to Gävle, where she arrived on 9 June.
Sulina	Flag unknown	The barque was driven ashore at Oporto between 23 and 25 June. She was refloated.
Volga	United Kingdom	The ship was wrecked in the Prince of Wales Channel after 24 June. Her crew were rescued. She was on a voyage from Sydney to Newcastle, New South Wales.
Winifred	United Kingdom	The ship ran aground on the Shipwash Sand, in the North Sea off the coast of Suffolk.
