= TSS Reindeer =

History
- Name: 1897–1928: TSS Reindeer
- Operator: 1897–1928: Great Western Railway
- Port of registry: (United Kingdom)
- Builder: Naval Construction and Armaments Company, Barrow-in-Furness
- Launched: 1 April 1897
- Out of service: 1928
- Fate: Scrapped 1928

General characteristics
- Tonnage: 1,281 gross register tons (GRT)
- Length: 280 feet (85 m)
- Beam: 34.4 feet (10.5 m)
- Draught: 16.66 feet (5.08 m)
- Installed power: 643 hp
- Speed: 19.5 kts

TSS Reindeer was a passenger vessel built for the Great Western Railway in 1897.

== History ==
This ship was one of a pair, the other being TSS Roebuck, built by the Naval Construction and Armaments Company in Barrow-in-Furness in 1897. She was launched on 1 May 1897.

In an inauspicious start to her career, she collided with the Brodick Castle in Weymouth Harbour on 3 September 1897.

She was put in reserve in 1925 when new steamers St Julien and St Helier arrived. She continued in occasional service, and on 12 March 1926 struck the entrance to Jersey Harbour. She was cut up at Briton Ferry in 1928.
