= Sambur =

Sambur may refer to:

- Marvin R. Sambur (born 1946), American engineer and businessman
- Sambur (Hasidic dynasty), the name of two distinct Hasidic dynasties
- Sambur deer or Sambar deer, a large deer native to the Indian subcontinent, South China, and Southeast Asia that is listed as a vulnerable species
- TSS Sambur (1925), a cargo vessel built for the Great Western Railway in 1925
