= Admiral Palliser =

Admiral Palliser may refer to:

- Arthur Palliser (1890–1956), British Royal Navy admiral
- Henry Palliser (1839–1907), British Royal Navy admiral
- Hugh Palliser (1723–1796), British Royal Navy admiral
