= PS Waterford =

Historical ship

History
- Name: PS Waterford
- Operator: Great Western Railway
- Port of registry: (United Kingdom)
- Route: Milford Haven - Waterford
- Builder: William Simons and Company, Renfrew
- Yard number: 177
- Launched: 19 February 1874
- Out of service: 1905
- Fate: Scrapped 1905

General characteristics
- Tonnage: 912 gross register tons (GRT)
- Length: 251.8 feet (76.7 m)
- Beam: 29.2 feet (8.9 m)

PS Waterford was a passenger vessel built for the Great Western Railway in 1874.

== History ==
PS Waterford was built by William Simons and Company of Renfrew and launched in 1874 for the Great Western Railway. She was placed on the Milford Haven to Waterford route with her sister ships PS Milford and PS Limerick.

She was scrapped in 1905 at Garston.
