= HMS St David =

Three ships of the Royal Navy have borne the name HMS St David, after Saint David, patron saint of Wales:

- HMS St David (1667) was a 54-gun fourth rate launched in 1667. She foundered in 1690, was raised in 1691 and hulked, and finally sold in 1713
- HMS St David is the name given to a number of tenders of the South Wales [Royal Naval Reserve] unit, later HMS Cambria (shore establishment).
  - Motor minesweeper 233 was HMS St David between 1948 and 1956
  - HMS Brereton (M1112) was HMS St David between 1954 and 1961
  - HMS Crichton (M1124) was HMS St David between 1961 and 1976
  - HMS St David (M07) was a converted minesweeper launched in 1972 as the commercial trawler Suffolk Monarch. She was converted and commissioned into service as the tender to the South Wales Division RNR in 1978 and was the test-bed for the Deep-Armed Team Sweep (DATS) concept, which eventually saw fruition in the River-class MSF. Following her de-commissioning, she was returned to her original owner in 1983, where she was converted into an oil rig safety/standby vessel.
- It has been suggested that a 1920s N3-class battleship ultimately not ordered could have been named HMS St David.

== See also ==
- St David (ship), other ships with the name
- St David (disambiguation)
