= PS Cheshire =

Passenger vessel

History
- Name: 1889–1913: PS Cheshire
- Operator: 1889–1905: Birkenhead Town Council; 1905–1913: Great Western Railway
- Port of registry: (United Kingdom)
- Builder: Canada Works Engineering and Shipbuilding Company, Birkenhead
- Launched: 1889
- Fate: Broken up 1911

General characteristics
- Tonnage: 387 GRT
- Length: 142 feet (43 m)
- Beam: 48 feet (15 m)
- Draught: 10 feet (3.0 m)
- Installed power: 510 hp
- Propulsion: Two diagonal compound S.C. engines

PS Cheshire was a passenger vessel built for the Town Council of Birkenhead in 1889 for use as a Mersey ferry.

== History ==
She was built in Canada Works, Birkenhead in 1889 for the Town Council of Birkenhead for use as a Mersey Ferry. There was some dispute with the builder as she was refused by the commissioners, and was put up for sale, but the highest bid of £4,500 (equivalent to £628,254 in 2023) did not meet the reserve price, so she was withdrawn.

In 1903 she was put up for sale by the Birkenhead Corporation and eventually she was sold to the Great Western Railway who deployed her as a tender in Plymouth.

On 9 December 1905 she was in collision with the Maggie Hough of Liverpool in dense fog in Plymouth sound. The Cheshire had just taken on board from the American liner SS City of New York 47 passengers and mail bags, and did not see the Maggie Hough which was anchoring in the channel for the fog to lift.

She was broken up in Germany in October 1911.
