= TSS St Patrick =

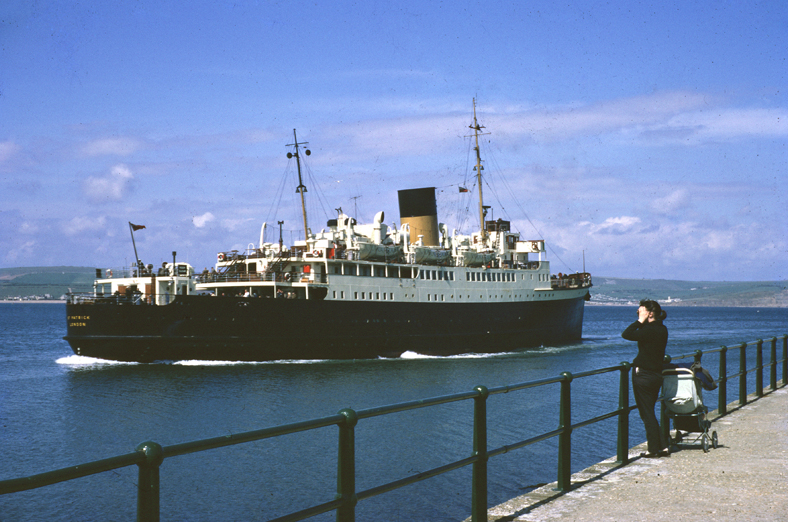
- St Patrick at Weymouth

History
- Name: 1947–1972: TSS St Patrick; 1972–1973: Thermopylae; 1973–1980: Agapitos I
- Operator: 1948: Great Western Railway; 1948–1972: British Railways; 1972–1973: Gerasimos S. Fetouris; 1973–1980: Agapitos Bros, Piraeus
- Port of registry: (United Kingdom)
- Route: 1948: Fishguard - Rosslare; 1948–1963: Weymouth - Cherbourg; 1963–1965: Southampton - Saint Malo & Le Havre; 1965–1972: Folkestone - Boulogne
- Builder: Cammell Laird, Birkenhead
- Yard number: 1183
- Launched: May 1947
- Completed: 23 January 1948
- Out of service: 1980
- Fate: Scrapped 1980

General characteristics
- Tonnage: 3,482 gross register tons (GRT)
- Length: 97.9 metres (321 ft)
- Beam: 14.69 metres (48.2 ft)
- Draught: 4.02 metres (13.2 ft)
- Installed power: 8,500 bhp
- Speed: 19 knots
- Capacity: 1,200 passengers

TSS St Patrick (III) was a passenger vessel operated by the Great Western Railway from 1947 until 1948 and British Railways from 1948 until 1971. She saw further service in Greece as the Thermopylae and Agapitos I until being scrapped in 1980.

== History ==
St Patrick was built for the Great Western Railway in 1947 as one of a pair of new vessels for the Fishguard to Rosslare service, the other being the St David. She replaced a former ship of the same name which had been sunk by torpedo on 13 June 1941. British Railways took ownership in 1948 and she was based in Weymouth. Typically running services to Cherbourg, she was also used in the summer for trips from Torquay to the Channel Islands. In 1963 she was transferred to Southampton for services to Saint Malo and Le Havre, and in 1965 she moved to Folkestone for the service to Boulogne. She was retired in 1971.

She was sold in 1972 to Gerasimos S. Fetouris, in Piraeus, and renamed Thermopylae. She was sold again in 1973 to Agapitos Bros, Piraeus and renamed Agapitos I. She was scrapped in 1980 in Greece.
