= TSS Sir Walter Raleigh =

History
- Name: 1908–1968: TSS Sir Walter Raleigh
- Operator: 1908–1946: Great Western Railway
- Port of registry: (United Kingdom)
- Builder: Cammell Laird, Birkenhead
- Yard number: 683
- Launched: 1908
- Fate: Scrapped 1968

General characteristics
- Tonnage: 478 gross register tons (GRT)
- Length: 151.5 feet (46.2 m)
- Beam: 38.5 feet (11.7 m)
- Draught: 9 feet (2.7 m)
- Depth: 14.6 feet (4.5 m)

TSS Sir Walter Raleigh was a passenger tender vessel built for the Great Western Railway in 1908.

== History ==
TSS Sir Walter Raleigh was built by Cammell Laird as one of a pair of vessels, with TSS Sir Francis Drake. She was on trial in the Mersey during April 1908.

She was hired to the Admiralty as a tug from 1914 to 1919.

In August 1939 she was again taken on by the Admiralty but operated from Plymouth. She was damaged during an air raid on 15 December 1940 when 8 crew were injured.

In 1942 alterations were made to her superstructure for use as a mining tender.

She returned to the GWR at the end of 1945 but the following year was sold and found use with various salvage operators until cut up in 1968.
