= PS Pen Cw =

History
- Name: 1912–1927: Pen Cw; 1927–1933: Ingleby Cross; 1933–1962: Elie
- Operator: 1912–1927: Great Western Railway; 1927–1933: Tees Towing Company, Middlesbrough; 1927–1962: Grangemouth and Forth Towing Company
- Port of registry: (United Kingdom)
- Builder: Eltringham and Company, South Shields
- Yard number: 291
- Launched: 24 October 1912
- Fate: Scrapped December 1962

General characteristics
- Tonnage: 168 gross register tons (GRT)
- Length: 105 feet (32 m)
- Beam: 21 feet (6.4 m)
- Draught: 9.4 feet (2.9 m)

PS Pen Cw was a tug built for the Great Western Railway in 1912.

== History ==
The Pen Cw was built by Eltringham and Company in South Shields and launched on 24 October 1912. She was used as a tug for tender operations at Fishguard Harbour.

On 1 July 1927 she was sold to the Tees Towing Company in Middlesbrough for £1,750 (equivalent to £131,900 in 2023) and renamed Ingleby Cross. On 29 November 1933 she was sold to the Grangemouth and Forth Towing Company and renamed Elie. From November 1939 to February 1942 she was requisitioned by the Admiralty and used in Rosyth Dockyard.

In December 1962 she was sent to White and Co at St Davids on Forth for scrapping.
