= Saint David (disambiguation) =

Saint David (Dewi Sant, c. 500 – c. 589), is the patron saint of Wales.

Saint David or Saint Davids may also refer to:

== People ==
- King David of Israel, feast day December 29
- David the Dendrite (tree-dweller) of Thessalonica (c. 450 – 540)
- David of Gareji (fl. 6th century)
- David of Muscovy (AKA Saint Gleb – see Boris and Gleb) (died c. 1015–1019)
- David of Munktorp, 11th-century missionary to Sweden
- David IV of Georgia (c. 1073 – 1125)
- King David I of Scotland (1084–1153)
- David Nemanjić (fl. 13th century)
- David Lewis (Jesuit priest) (1616–1679), Welsh Catholic martyr
- David Zeisberger
- David Livingstone
- David Galván Bermúdez (1881–1915), one of 25 Martyrs of the Cristero War
- David Roldán Lara (1902–1926), one of 25 Martyrs of the Cristero War
- David Uribe Velasco (1888–1927), one of 25 Martyrs of the Cristero War

also

- Viscount St Davids of the Philipps family

== Places ==
- St Davids, Pembrokeshire, Wales, smallest city in the United Kingdom
- Saint David Parish, Dominica
- Saint David Parish, Grenada
- Saint David Parish, Saint Vincent and the Grenadines
- Saint David Parish, New Brunswick, Canada, a civil parish near St. Stephen
- Saint David, Trinidad and Tobago
- St. David, Arizona, United States
- St. David, Illinois, United States
- St. Davids, Pennsylvania, United States
- St. David (provincial electoral district), defunct electoral district (1926–1987) in Ontario, Canada

== Establishments ==
- St David's Cathedral in St David's, Pembrokeshire, Wales
- St David's Cathedral (Hobart), Tasmania, Australia
- St. David Catholic Secondary School, high school in Waterloo, Ontario
- St. David's School (Raleigh, North Carolina), US
- St. Davids (SEPTA station), a commuter rail station in Pennsylvania, US

== Other uses ==
- HMS St David, several ships of the Royal Navy
- St David (ship), other ships with the name

== See also ==
- Saint David's Day, 1 March
