= TSS Lynx =

British passenger ship

History
- Name: 1889–1913: TSS Lynx; WW1: HMS Lynn
- Operator: 1889–1913: Great Western Railway; WW1: Royal Navy
- Port of registry: (United Kingdom)
- Builder: Laird Brothers, Birkenhead
- Yard number: 571
- Launched: 1889
- Fate: Scrapped

General characteristics
- Tonnage: 880 gross register tons (GRT)
- Length: 235 ft (72 m)
- Beam: 27.5 ft (8.4 m)
- Draught: 11 ft (3.4 m)
- Depth: 14 ft (4.3 m)

TSS Lynx was a passenger vessel built for the Great Western Railway in 1889.

== History ==
Laird Brothers in Birkenhead built her as one of a trio of new ships for the Great Western Railway, serving as a twin-screw steamer for the Channel Island Services. The other ships were TSS Gazelle and TSS Antelope.

Most of the passenger accommodation was removed in 1910, after which she was operated as a cargo vessel.

She served as minesweeper HMS Lynn in the Mediterranean during World War I and was finally broken up after 36 year's service.
