= St Helier East (ward) =

Electoral ward in London, England

- Electoral ward for the Sutton London Borough Council
- Borough: London Borough of Sutton
- County: Greater London
- Population: 8,556 (2021)
- Major settlements: St Helier, London
- Area: 1.116 km²

Current electoral ward
- Created: 2022
- Seats: 2
- Created from: St Helier

St Helier East is an electoral ward in the London Borough of Sutton. The ward was first used in the 2022 elections and elects two councillors to Sutton London Borough Council.

== Geography ==
The ward is named after the suburb of St Helier, London.

== Councillors ==
Election	Councillors	
2022	Paul Cole (Liberal Democrats)	Gemma Munday (Liberal Democrats)

== Elections ==
=== 2022 ===
St Helier East (2)
Party	Candidate	Votes	%	±%
Liberal Democrats	Paul Cole	643	41.6	
Liberal Democrats	Gemma Munday	631	40.8	
Labour	Sarah Gwynn	499	32.3	
Labour	Grace Platt	439	28.4	
Conservative	Matthew Drew	386	25.0	
Conservative	Ann Page	370	24.0	
Green	Nicola Williams	121	7.8	
Turnout				
Liberal Democrats win (new seat)				
Liberal Democrats win (new seat)				

== See also ==
- List of electoral wards in Greater London
