= St Helier West (ward) =

Electoral ward in London, England

- Electoral ward for the Sutton London Borough Council
- St Helier West ward boundaries since 2022
- Borough: Sutton
- County: Greater London
- Population: 12,178 (2021) (Note: 2021 Census data reported for 2022 ward boundaries)
- Electorate: 8,542 (2022)
- Major settlements: Rosehill
- Area: 1.460 square kilometres (0.564 sq mi)

Current electoral ward
- Created: 2022
- Number of members: 3
- Councillors: Joicy Joseph; Janey Gould; Alison Long
- Created from: St Helier
- GSS code: E05013762

St Helier West is an electoral ward in the London Borough of Sutton. The ward was first used in the 2022 elections. It returns three councillors to Sutton London Borough Council.

== List of councillors ==
| Seat | Councillor | Took office | Left office | Party | Election |
|---|---|---|---|---|---|
| 1 | Sheila Berry | 2022 | 2024 | Labour | 2022 |
| 2 | Steven Alvarez | 2022 | 2026 | Conservative | 2022 |
| 3 | Wendy Clark | 2022 | 2026 | Conservative | 2022 |
| 1 | Catherine Gray | 2024 | 2026 | Conservative | 2024 |
| 1 | Joicy Joseph | 2026 | Incumbent | Liberal Democrats | 2026 |
| 2 | Janey Gould | 2026 | Incumbent | Reform | 2026 |
| 3 | Alison Long | 2026 | Incumbent | Reform | 2026 |

== Sutton council elections ==
=== 2026 election ===
The election took place on 7 May 2026.

2026 Sutton London Borough Council election: St Helier West
| Party | Candidate | Votes | % | ±% |
|---|---|---|---|---|
| Liberal Democrats | Joicy Joseph | 1,038 | | |
| Reform | Janey Gould | 1,021 | | |
| Reform | Alison Long | 1,018 | | |
| Liberal Democrats | Dean Juster | 1,014 | | |
| Reform | Trevor Smith | 988 | | |
| Liberal Democrats | Parveen Kumar | 927 | | |
| Conservative | Steve Alvarez | 558 | | |
| Conservative | Wendy Clark | 532 | | |
| Green | Abdul Khan | 495 | | |
| Conservative | Martin Bustamante | 485 | | |
| Green | Harriet Napolitano | 459 | | |
| Green | Daniel Rayner | 407 | | |
| Labour | Jesh Abraham | 281 | | |
| Labour | Kingsley Abrams | 279 | | |
| Labour | Nick Eaves | 260 | | |
| Turnout | | | | |
| Liberal Democrats gain from Conservative | | Swing | | |
| Reform gain from Conservative | | Swing | | |
| Reform gain from Conservative | | Swing | | |

=== 2024 by-election ===
The by-election was held on 2 May 2024. It took place on the same day as the 2024 London mayoral election, the 2024 London Assembly election and 14 other borough council by-elections across London.

2024 St Helier West by-election
| Party | Candidate | Votes | % | ±% |
|---|---|---|---|---|
| Conservative | Catherine Gray | 1,342 | 35.4 | |
| Liberal Democrats | Noor Sumun | 1,336 | 35.3 | |
| Labour | Margaret Thomas | 682 | 18.0 | |
| Independent | Activist Kingsley Hamilton | 367 | 9.7 | |
| Independent | Renos Costi | 62 | 1.6 | |
| Majority | | 6 | 0.1 | |
| Turnout | | 3,825 | | |
| Conservative gain from Labour | | Swing | | |

=== 2022 election ===
The election took place on 5 May 2022.

2022 Sutton London Borough Council election: St Helier West
| Party | Candidate | Votes | % | ±% |
|---|---|---|---|---|
| Labour | Sheila Berry | 848 | 35.5 | |
| Conservative | Steven Alvarez | 823 | 34.5 | |
| Conservative | Wendy Clark | 808 | 33.8 | |
| Labour | Nicholas Diamantis | 780 | 32.7 | |
| Labour | Paul McCarthy | 776 | 32.5 | |
| Conservative | Ethan Windsor | 751 | 31.5 | |
| Liberal Democrats | Omavally Narayana Pillay | 729 | 30.5 | |
| Liberal Democrats | Peter Chubb | 703 | 29.4 | |
| Liberal Democrats | Jean Crossby* | 702 | 29.4 | |
| Green | Peter Mead | 243 | 10.2 | |
| Turnout | | | | |
| Labour win (new seat) | | | | |
| Conservative win (new seat) | | | | |
| Conservative win (new seat) | | | | |
