= St Helier (Sutton ward) =

- Former electoral ward for the Sutton London Borough Council
- St Helier (Sutton) ward boundaries
- Borough: Sutton
- County: Greater London

Former electoral ward
- Created: 2002
- Abolished: 2022
- Councillors: 3
- Replaced by: St Helier East, St Helier West
- GSS code: E05000562

St Helier was an electoral ward in the London Borough of Sutton from 2002 to 2022. The ward was first used in the 2002 elections and last used at the 2018 elections. It returned three councillors to Sutton London Borough Council.

== Sutton council elections ==
=== 2018 election ===
The election took place on 3 May 2018.

2018 Sutton London Borough Council election: St Helier
Party	Candidate	Votes	%	±%
Liberal Democrats	Jean Crossby	1,063	41.8	+0.7
Liberal Democrats	Martin Gonzalez	977	38.4	+1.6
Liberal Democrats	Annie Moral	922	36.3	−0.4
Labour	Nick Diamantis	876	34.5	+9.3
Labour	Maggie Hughes	800	31.5	+8.0
Labour	Patrick Sim	745	29.3	+7.5
Conservative	Steven Ayres	583	22.9	+9.8
Conservative	Simon Densley	513	20.2	+9.2
Conservative	Simon Higgs	497	19.6	+9.1
UKIP	John Brereton	255	10.0	−19.0
UKIP	Eleanor Smith	180	7.1	N/A
UKIP	Ian Rawat	178	7.0	N/A
National Front	Richard Edmonds	49	1.9	N/A
Rejected ballots		8		
Turnout		2,549	29.21	
Liberal Democrats hold		Swing		
Liberal Democrats hold		Swing		
Liberal Democrats hold		Swing		

=== 2014 election ===
The election took place on 22 May 2014.

2014 Sutton London Borough Council election: St Helier
Party	Candidate	Votes	%	±%
Liberal Democrats	Jean Crossby	1,195	41.1	
Liberal Democrats	Martin Gonzalez	1,070	36.8	
Liberal Democrats	Doug Hunt	1,069	36.7	
UKIP	Michael Lyon	843	29.0	
Labour	Nicola Rosenbaum	734	25.2	
Labour	John Keys	685	23.5	
Labour	Andrew Theobald	637	21.9	
Conservative	Lottie Crowley	380	13.1	
Conservative	Alan Oliver	320	11.0	
Conservative	Alison Huneke	306	10.5	
Turnout		2,910	34.7	−23.4
Liberal Democrats hold		Swing		
Liberal Democrats hold		Swing		
Liberal Democrats hold		Swing		

=== 2010 election ===
The election on 6 May 2010 took place on the same day as the United Kingdom general election.

=== 2006 election ===
The election took place on 4 May 2006.

2006 Sutton London Borough Council election: St Helier
Party	Candidate	Votes	%	±%
Liberal Democrats	Sheila Andrews	1,257	43.1	
Liberal Democrats	David Callaghan	1,161		
Liberal Democrats	David Theobald	1,147		
Labour	Charles Mansell	674	23.1	
Labour	Andrew Theobald	674		
Labour	Joseph Magee	662		
BNP	Charlotte Lewis	588	20.2	
Conservative	Gillian Walker	396	13.6	
Conservative	Eric Pillinger	365		
Conservative	Thomas Wortley	362		
Turnout			35.3	
Liberal Democrats gain from Labour		Swing		
Liberal Democrats gain from Labour		Swing		
Liberal Democrats gain from Labour		Swing		

=== 2002 election ===
The election took place on 2 May 2002.
