= TSS Gazelle =

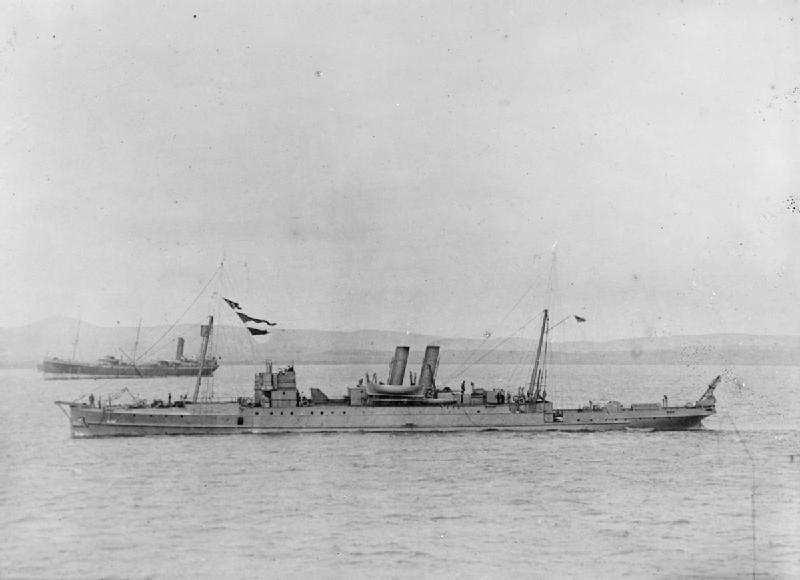
- As HMS Gazelle

History
- Name: 1889–1925: TSS Gazelle
- Operator: 1889–1925: Great Western Railway
- Port of registry: (United Kingdom)
- Builder: Laird Brothers, Birkenhead
- Yard number: 573
- Launched: 1889
- Out of service: 1925
- Fate: Scrapped 1925

General characteristics
- Tonnage: 880 gross register tons (GRT)
- Length: 235 ft (72 m)
- Beam: 27.5 ft (8.4 m)
- Draught: 11 ft (3.4 m)
- Depth: 14 ft (4.3 m)

TSS Gazelle was a passenger vessel built for the Great Western Railway in 1889.

== History ==
She was built by Cammell Laird in Birkenhead as one of a trio of new ships for the Great Western Railway as a twin-screw steamer for the Channel Island Services. The other ships were TSS Antelope and TSS Lynx.

In 1907 most of the passenger accommodation was removed and she was then operated on cargo services.

She served as a minesweeper in the Mediterranean Sea during World War I and was finally broken up after 36 years service in 1925.
