= TSS Roebuck (1925) =

History
- Name: 1925–1940: TSS Roebuck; 1940–1945: TSS Roebuck II; 1945–1965: TSS Roebuck
- Operator: 1925–1948: Great Western Railway; 1948–1965: British Railways
- Port of registry: (United Kingdom)
- Builder: Swan Hunter and Wigham Richardson
- Yard number: 1204
- Launched: 24 March 1925
- Completed: April 1925
- Out of service: 1965
- Fate: Scrapped

General characteristics
- Tonnage: 769 gross register tons (GRT)
- Length: 201.2 feet (61.3 m)
- Beam: 33.7 feet (10.3 m)
- Draught: 1,015.36 feet (309.48 m)
- Speed: 12 kts

TSS Roebuck was a cargo vessel built for the Great Western Railway in 1925.

== History ==
TSS Roebuck was built by Swan Hunter and Wigham Richardson as one of a pair of new cargo vessels, the other being Sambur, and launched on 24 March 1925. She was put to work on freight services between the Channel Islands and Weymouth.

In May 1940 she took part in the Dunkirk evacuation, making one trip to the beachhead and evacuating 600 men, including many injured. Then in June she was sent with her sister ship Sambur to Saint-Valery-en-Caux to assist in the evacuation of the 51st Highland Division. However, by the time they arrived the Germans were already in control of the port and both ships were damaged by gunfire. In October 1940 she was requisitioned by the Admiralty for use as a barrage balloon vessel in the Thames and around northern France and renamed Roebuck II. She returned to railway service after the war and resumed operation at Weymouth and in 1948 was taken over by British Railways.

In November 1964 she was disguised as the Norwegian SS Galtesund for a film, The Heroes of Telemark.

She continued in service until 27 February 1965, and was scrapped later the same year.
