= TSS Roebuck (1897) =

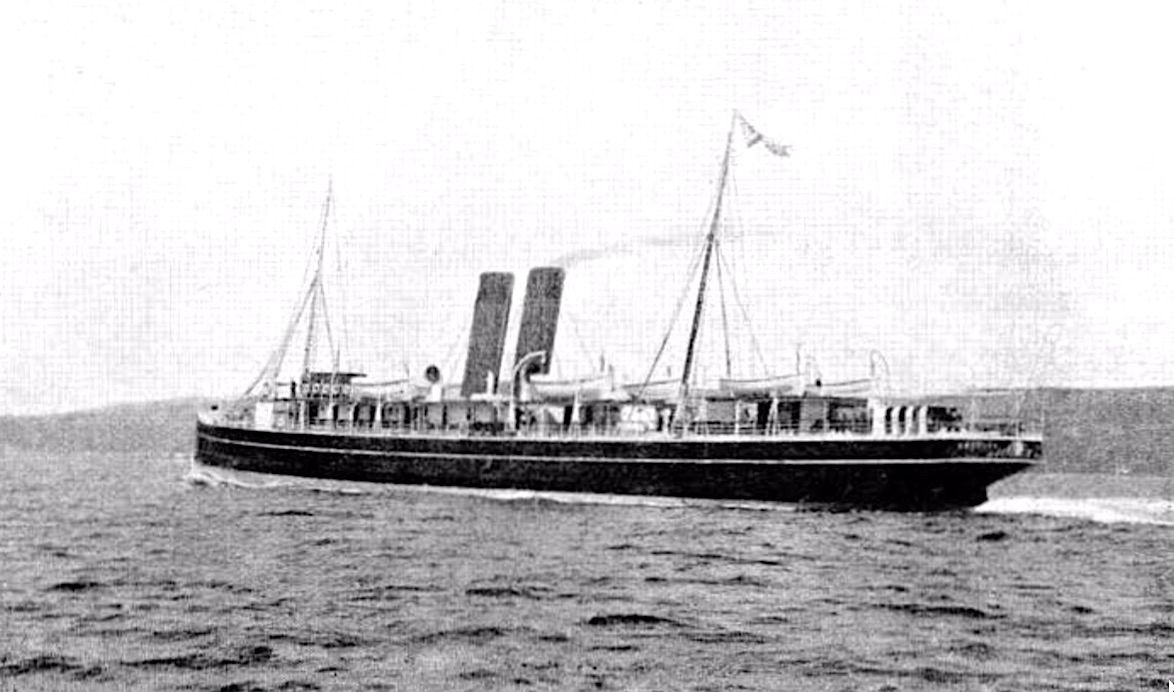
- 1897 view of the new twin screw ship, described as having been tested at 20 knots and with a breadth of 24½ feet

History
- Name: 1897–1914: TSS Roebuck; 1914–1915: HMS Roedean
- Operator: 1897–1915: Great Western Railway; 1914–1915: Royal Navy
- Port of registry: (United Kingdom)
- Builder: Naval Construction and Armaments Company, Barrow-in-Furness
- Launched: 6 March 1897
- Maiden voyage: 1 July 1897
- Out of service: 1915
- Fate: Sunk 13 January 1915

General characteristics
- Tonnage: 1,281 gross register tons (GRT)
- Length: 280 feet (85 m)
- Beam: 34.4 feet (10.5 m)
- Draught: 16.66 feet (5.08 m)
- Installed power: 643 hp
- Speed: 12 kts

TSS Roebuck was a passenger vessel built for the Great Western Railway in 1897.

== History ==
This ship was one of a pair, the other being TSS Reindeer, built by the Naval Construction and Armaments Company in Barrow-in-Furness in 1897. She was launched on 6 March 1897 by Mrs Bryce, wife of Annan Bryce, director of the Naval Construction and Armaments Company. Her maiden voyage from Weymouth to Guernsey and Jersey was on 1 July 1897 which she completed in a record time of 3 hours 20 minutes.

On 26 January 1905 she caught fire while moored at Milford. The weight of water used to put out the fire caused her to sink but she was raised nine days later and returned to service in June.

She ran aground after leaving St Helier on 19 July 1911 during dense fog, refloated on 28 July and returned to service four months later. The master had his certificate suspended for three months.

In 1914 she was converted for minesweeping and renamed HMS Roedean. On 13 January 1915 she dragged her anchor at Scapa Flow and sank following a collision with HMS Imperieuse, the first railway ship to be lost on war service.
