= PS South of Ireland =

History
- Name: 1867–1891: PS South of Ireland
- Operator: 1867–1872: Ford and Jackson; 1872–1890: Great Western Railway
- Port of registry: (United Kingdom)
- Builder: William Simons and Company, Renfrew
- Yard number: 143
- Launched: 6 July 1867
- Completed: 1867
- Out of service: 25 December 1883
- Fate: Wrecked

General characteristics
- Tonnage: 498 gross register tons (GRT)
- Length: 220.4 ft (67.2 m)
- Beam: 25.2 ft (7.7 m)
- Installed power: 190 hp
- Propulsion: 2 cylinder compound oscillating engine

PS South of Ireland was a passenger vessel built for Ford and Jackson in 1867 and then used by the Great Western Railway from 1872 to 1883.

== History ==
She was built by William Simons of Renfrew and launched on 6 July 1867. She was completed in 1867 and owned by Ford and Jackson and deployed on their Milford to Cork route. She was a twin-funnel sister to the PS Great Western.

In 1872 she was purchased by the Great Western Railway and transferred to the Weymouth to Cherbourg service. At 1 am on Christmas Day 1883 she was on a voyage from Cherbourg to Weymouth, and ran aground on Kimmeridge Ledges, 15 miles from Weymouth. Several steamers left Weymouth to assist in the rescue, and all hands were saved.
