= PS Baron Osy =

History
- Name: 1851–1857: PS Baron Osy; 1857–1884: PS Malakhoff
- Operator: 1851–1857: Antwerp Steam Navigation Company; 1857–1872: Ford and Jackson; 1872–1884: Great Western Railway
- Port of registry: (United Kingdom)
- Builder: Robinson and Russell of Millwall
- Launched: 17 April 1851
- Out of service: 1884

General characteristics
- Tonnage: 125 gross register tons (GRT)
- Length: 210 feet (64 m)
- Beam: 28 feet (8.5 m)
- Depth: 16 feet (4.9 m)

PS Baron Osy was a passenger vessel built for the Antwerp Steam Navigation Company in 1851.

== History ==
PS Baron Osy was built by Robinson and John Scott Russell of Millwall and launched on 17 April 1851 by Mrs Lichfield, the wife of a veteran officer in Her Majesty's Royal Navy. She was christened Baron Osy after a member of the Belgian legislature, to whom the Antwerp company were much indebted.

She later undertook work for the British government during the Crimean War when she was renamed Malakhoff.

In July 1856 she was acquired by Ford and Jackson and operated between Milford and Waterford and Cork until 1872 when the Great Western Railway took over the Ford and Jackson concern.

The Malakhoff was withdrawn in 1884.
