= TSS Great Southern =

History
- Name: 1902–1934: TSS Great Southern
- Operator: 1902–1934: Great Western Railway
- Port of registry: (United Kingdom)
- Builder: Laird Brothers, Birkenhead
- Yard number: 650
- Launched: 25 January 1902
- Out of service: 1934
- Fate: Scrapped by John Cashmore, Newport, Monmouthshire

General characteristics
- Tonnage: 1,339 GRT

TSS Great Southern was a passenger vessel built for the Great Western Railway in 1902.

== History ==
She was built by Laird Brothers in Birkenhead for the Great Western Railway as a twin-screw steamer for the Irish Sea ferry service between Milford Haven and Waterford. She was a sister ship to TSS Great Western.

In 1910 she ran aground on shingle at Parkswood, Waterford River during a fog. She ran aground again in the same river in 1929.

Later in her career she operated occasionally from Weymouth on the Channel Islands service.

In 1934 she was sold for scrapping by John Cashmore of Newport, Monmouthshire.
