= TSS Ibex =

History
- Name: 1891–1925: TSS Ibex
- Operator: 1891–1925: Great Western Railway
- Port of registry: (United Kingdom)
- Builder: Cammell Laird, Birkenhead
- Yard number: 584
- Launched: 6 June 1891
- Out of service: 14 April 1925
- Fate: Scrapped 1925

General characteristics
- Tonnage: 1,150 gross register tons (GRT)
- Length: 265 feet (81 m)
- Beam: 32.5 feet (9.9 m)
- Draught: 14.15 feet (4.31 m)
- Installed power: 282 hp
- Speed: 19 kts

TSS Ibex was a passenger vessel built for the Great Western Railway in 1891.

== History ==
The Great Western Railway introduced three new steamers on the Weymouth to the Channel Islands service in 1889. The great acceleration of the service and the improved accommodation in the new steamers were quickly appreciated by the public, and the traffic grew to such an extent that the company ordered a fourth vessel in 1891. TSS Ibex was launched on 6 June 1891 by Mrs Laird.

She struck the Noirmontaise rocks off Jersey on 16 April 1897 and was beached in Portlet Bay. The master of the ship was later found at fault and had his certificate suspended for six months.

Less than three years later, on 5 January 1900, she struck a reef at St Peter Port, Guernsey, and sank within 10 minutes. One passenger and one crewman died. She settled on a rock in eight fathoms of water. The board of enquiry found that the master was alone in default, and suspended him for 6 months. She was raised on 21 July 1900 and returned to service the following April after repairs.

In 1916 a 12-pound gun was mounted on her stern; and on 18 April 1918 she fired on and sank a U-boat for which the crew received a £500 reward.

She sailed on her last voyage on 14 April 1925. She was cut up at Sharpness in 1925.
