= PS Limerick =

History
- Name: 1874–1902: PS Limerick
- Operator: 1874–1902: Great Western Railway
- Port of registry: (United Kingdom)
- Route: Milford Haven - Waterford
- Builder: William Simons and Company, Renfrew
- Launched: 20 May 1874
- Out of service: 1902
- Fate: Scrapped 1902

General characteristics
- Tonnage: 961 gross register tons (GRT)
- Length: 251.8 feet (76.7 m)
- Beam: 29.2 feet (8.9 m)

PS Limerick was a passenger vessel built for the Great Western Railway in 1874.

== History ==
She was built by William Simons and Company of Renfrew and launched on 20 May 1874 by Miss Baird, niece of Mr Glover, consulting engineer of the Great Western Railway. She undertook sea trials in June and on 12 June realised a speed of 14 knots over 90 miles.

She was placed on the Milford Haven to Waterford route with her sister ships PS Milford and PS Waterford.

She was scrapped in 1902 in Dordrecht.
