= HMS Imperieuse =

Six ships and a training establishment of the Royal Navy have borne the name HMS Imperieuse:

- HMS Imperieuse (1793) was a 40-gun fifth-rate captured from the French in 1793. She was renamed HMS Unite in 1803, was on harbour service from 1832, and was broken up in 1858.
- HMS Amphitrite (1799) was a 40-gun fifth rate that the Dutch launched on 30 October 1797 and the British captured in 1799. The Royal Navy renamed her Imperieuse in 1801; she was broken up in 1805.
- HMS Imperieuse (1805) was a 38-gun fifth-rate, previously the Spanish ship Medea (1797). She was captured in 1804 and taken into service as HMS Iphigenia but renamed Imperieuse in 1805, placed on harbour service in 1818, and sold in 1838.
- HMS Imperieuse (1852) was a wooden screw frigate launched in 1852 and sold in 1867.
- HMS Imperieuse (1883) was an Imperieuse-class armoured cruiser launched in 1883. She was converted into a depot ship in 1905 and renamed HMS Sapphire II. The name reverted to Imperieuse in 1909 and she was sold in 1913.
- HMS Imperieuse was the former ironclad battleship launched in 1869 as HMS Audacious. She became HMS Imperieuse in 1914 whilst serving as a repair ship. She was sold in 1927.
- HMS Imperieuse (training establishment) was a stoker's training establishment set up in 1944 aboard the obsolete battleships HMS Resolution and HMS Revenge. The establishment was paid off in 1948.

== See also ==
- HMS Imperial
