= TSS Sir John Hawkins =

History
- Name: 1931–1962: TSS Sir John Hawkins
- Operator: 1831–1948: Great Western Railway; 1948–1962: British Railways
- Port of registry: (United Kingdom)
- Builder: Earle’s Shipbuilding and Engineering Company, Hull
- Launched: 15 May 1929
- Out of service: May 1962
- Fate: Scrapped 1962

General characteristics
- Tonnage: 930 gross register tons (GRT)
- Length: 172.6 feet (52.6 m)
- Beam: 43 feet (13 m)
- Draught: 14.5 feet (4.4 m)

TSS Sir John Hawkins was a passenger tender vessel built for the Great Western Railway in 1929.

== History ==
TSS Sir John Hawkins was built by Earle's Shipbuilding and Engineering Company in Hull and launched on 15 May 1929. She was one of a pair built for tendering duties in Plymouth harbour, her sister TSS Sir Richard Grenville being launched two years later.

On 27 August 1940 she was damaged during an air raid. Following repairs she was taken over by the Royal Navy in January 1941 and saw service at Plymouth, Scapa Flow and Pentland Firth. She was returned to the GWR at Plymouth on 22 November 1945 and remained stationed there until 1962 when she was sold for scrap.

The vessel can be seen in the 1958 movie Dunkirk where it is portrayed in harbour returning troops evacuated from the beaches of Dunkirk during Operation Dynamo.
