= SS Melmore =

History

United Kingdom
- Name: 1892–1917: SS Melmore; 1917–1936: SS Santa Elena; 1936–1947: SS Condestable Celendon
- Operator: 1892–1904: Lord Leitrim; 1904–1905: West Cornwall Steam Ship Company; 1905–1912: Great Western Railway; 1912–1914: Charles Forbes; 1914–1916: Union Steamship Company of British Columbia; 1916–1917: Milne and Company of Vancouver; 1917–1920s: Tampion W.B. London of Vancouver; 1920s–1936: German E. Leith in Callao; 1936–1947: Ministry of Marine in Peru
- Port of registry: (United Kingdom)
- Builder: David J Dunlop
- Yard number: 214
- Launched: 26 May 1892
- Out of service: 1947
- Fate: Scrapped 1947

General characteristics
- Tonnage: 424 gross register tons (GRT)
- Length: 156.2 ft (47.6 m)
- Beam: 25.8 ft (7.9 m)
- Draught: 12 ft (3.7 m)
- Installed power: 100 hp
- Propulsion: Triple expansion single screw

SS Melmore was a passenger cargo vessel operated by the Great Western Railway from 1905 to 1912.

== History ==
SS Melmore was built by David Dunlop in Port Glasgow and launched on 26 May 1892. She was built for Robert Bermingham Clements, 4th Earl of Leitrim, intended to run between Glasgow, Portrush, Derry and Milford. She started service on 1 July 1892. She took her name from Melmore Head which is at the head of Melmore Bay in County Donegal.

In 1904 she was put up for sale and bought by the West Cornwall Steam Ship Company. She arrived in Penzance on 12 November 1904 and was put to work on her first service two days later. They kept her until 1905 when she was then sold to the Great Western Railway, and employed on cargo services between Weymouth and the Channel Islands, and also on the route from Plymouth to Nantes.

In 1912 she was sold to Charles Forbes who intended to use her for a treasure seeking expedition in Cocos Island Mrs Barry Till and Miss Genevieve Davis visited Cocos Island in 1911 and convinced themselves they had discovered a cave containing part of the treasure hidden by either Tom Tiddler or Benito Bonito. Despite the failure of earlier expeditions in 1903 by Admiral St Leger Palliser, and 1904 by William Wentworth-Fitzwilliam, 7th Earl Fitzwilliam and Admiral Palliser, they returned with maps and outfitted the Melmore in 1912. They obtained permission from the Costa Rican Government for the expedition. Melmore was sent to Panama where they joined her in December 1913 for the expedition. They arrived back in Panama on 24 February 1913 empty handed.

In 1914 she was purchased by the Melmore Steam Ship Company under the control of the Union Steamship Company of British Columbia in Vancouver. In 1916 she was sold to Milne and Company of Vancouver, and in 1917 to Tampion W.B. London of Vancouver who named her the Santa Elena. In 1920s she was sold to German E. Leith in Callao. Lastly she was sold to the Ministry of Marine in Peru in 1936 as a lighthouse tender and named Condestable Celendon. She was reported as out of use in 1947 when she was deleted from the Lloyds Register of Shipping.
