= TSS Great Western (1901) =

History
- Name: 1902–1933: TSS Great Western; 1933: GWR. No. 20
- Operator: 1902–1933: Great Western Railway
- Port of registry: (United Kingdom)
- Builder: Laird Brothers, Birkenhead
- Yard number: 649
- Launched: 12 December 1901
- Out of service: 1933
- Fate: Scrapped by John Cashmore, Newport, Monmouthshire

General characteristics
- Tonnage: 1,339 GRT

TSS Great Western was a passenger vessel built for the Great Western Railway in 1902.

== History ==
She was built by Laird Brothers in Birkenhead for the Great Western Railway as a twin-screw steamer for the Irish Sea ferry service between Milford Haven and Waterford. She was a sister ship to TSS Great Southern.

Later in her career she operated occasionally from Weymouth.

In 1931 it was reported that she achieved a record crossing from Fishguard to Waterford, maintaining an average speed of 19.9 knots.

In 1933 she was succeeded by a new ship of the same name, TSS Great Western and was renamed G.W.R. No. 20 until sold for scrapping by John Cashmore of Newport, Monmouthshire.
