= TSS Sir Francis Drake =

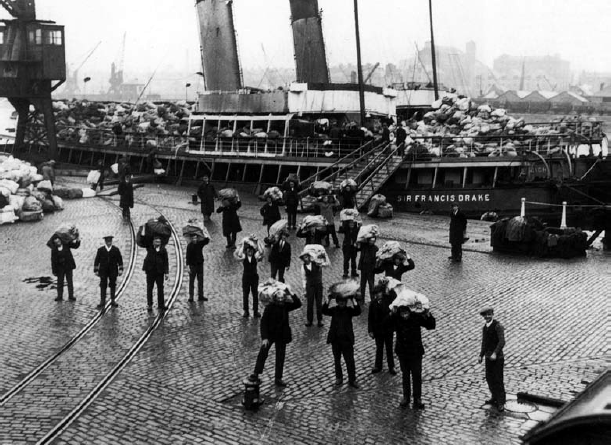
- Men unloading mail from the Sir Francis Drake at Millbay Docks, Plymouth in 1926

History
- Name: 1908–1954: TSS Sir Francis Drake
- Operator: 1908–1948: Great Western Railway; 1948–1954: British Railways
- Port of registry: (United Kingdom)
- Builder: Cammell Laird, Birkenhead
- Yard number: 682
- Launched: 18 February 1908
- Fate: Scrapped in Sutton Harbour, Plymouth 1954

General characteristics
- Tonnage: 478 gross register tons (GRT)
- Length: 151.5 feet (46.2 m)
- Beam: 38.5 feet (11.7 m)
- Draught: 9 feet (2.7 m)
- Depth: 14.6 feet (4.5 m)

TSS Sir Francis Drake was a passenger tender vessel built for the Great Western Railway in 1908.

== History ==
TSS Sir Francis Drake was built by Cammell Laird as one of a pair of vessels, with TSS Sir Walter Raleigh. She operated as a tender in Plymouth for 46 years and also sometimes at Fishguard.

She was hired to the Admiralty as a tug from 1914 to 1919. In August 1939 she was again hired to the Admiralty for use at Plymouth and later at Scapa Flow, returning to the GWR at Plymouth in 1946. She was broken up in Sutton Harbour, Plymouth, in 1954.
