= TSS Chelmsford =

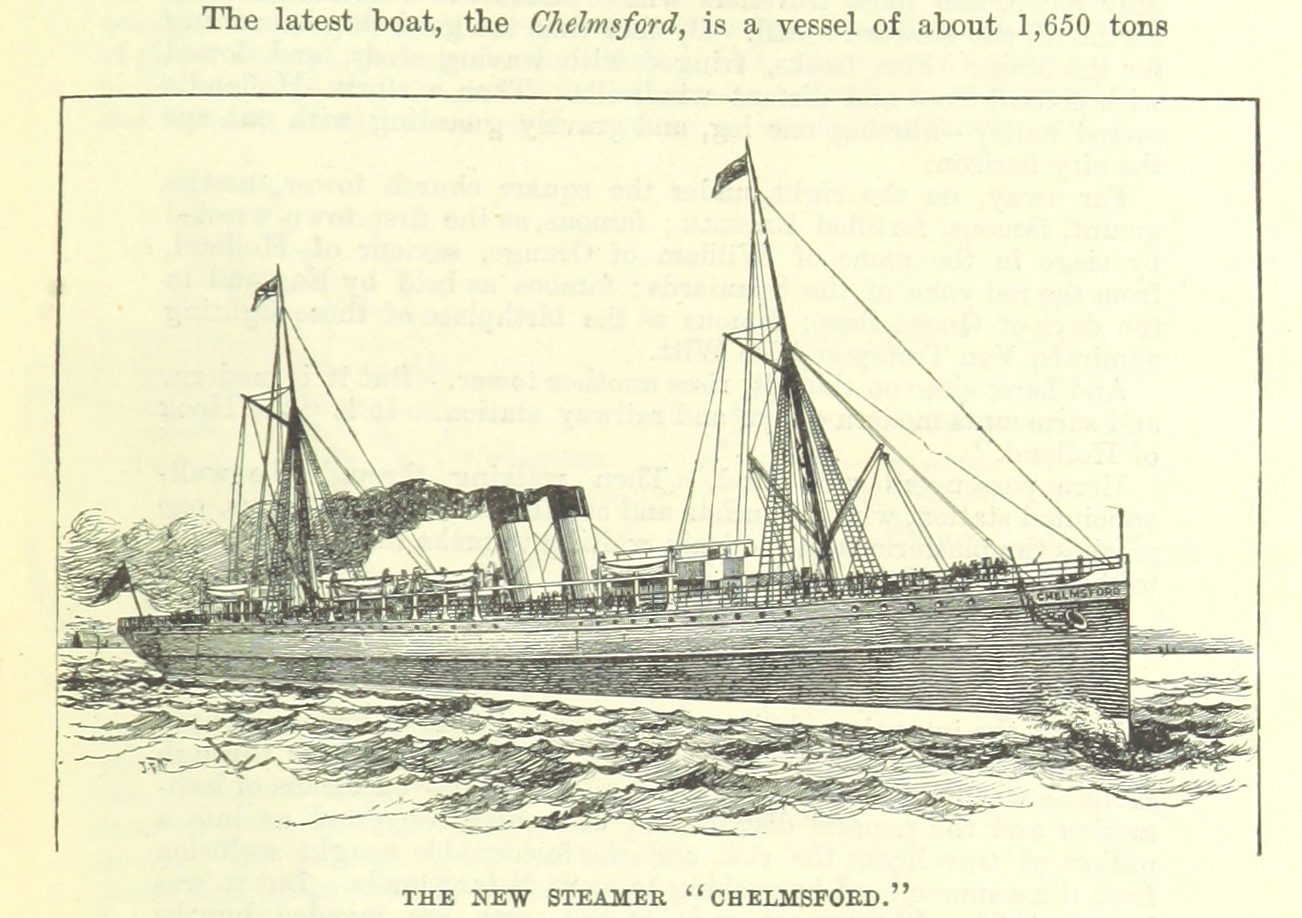
- Chelmsford illustrated in 'Holiday Handbooks. Practical guides to less frequented districts'.

History
- Name: 1893–1910: TSS Chelmsford; 1910–1911: TSS Bretonne; 1911–1920: TSS Esperia; 1920–ca. 1925: TSS Syros; 1925–1934: TSS Esperia
- Operator: 1893–1910: Great Eastern Railway; 1910–1911: Great Western Railway; 1911–1934: National Steam Navigation Company, Greece
- Port of registry: (United Kingdom)
- Builder: Earle's Shipbuilding and Engineering Company, Hull
- Launched: 21 February 1893
- Out of service: 1934
- Fate: Scrapped 1934

General characteristics
- Type: Twin-screw steamer
- Tonnage: 1,635 gross register tons (GRT)
- Length: 300 feet (91 m)
- Beam: 34.6 feet (10.5 m)
- Draught: 16 feet (4.9 m)

TSS Chelmsford was a passenger vessel built for the Great Eastern Railway in 1893.

== History ==
She was built by Earle's in Hull for the Great Eastern Railway. She was launched on 21 February 1893 and launched by the Mayoress of Chelmsford. She was intended for the new route from Harwich to the Hook of Holland. She was described as

having an awning deck extending almost the entire length of the ship and a complete lower deck all fore and aft. The first class dining saloon is forward of the boilers on the main deck, and extends from side to side. It is 32ft long, and is entered through a spacious lobby formed in the large deck-house on the awning deck, the illumination being mainly got by means of a handsome painted glass dome. The remainder of this house is occupied by state rooms, the captain's room, and a large ventilating truck for affording light and air to the dining room below. Forward of the saloon is a cabin and state-rooms specially arranged for ladies, and abaft the saloon on each side of the engines and boilers are other state-rooms, pantries, bar, lavatories, and officer's accommodation. Abaft the engines and boilers on this deck are also further state rooms for first-class passengers with a separate entrance lobby from a deck-house in which is a spacious smoke-room.

In 1910 she was purchased by the Great Western Railway for the route from Plymouth to Brest and renamed Bretonne. She was sold in the following year to the National Steam Navigation Company of Greece when she was renamed Esperia. For a short time in the early 1920s she was renamed Syros, but was renamed Esperia again until she was scrapped in 1934.
