= TSS St David (1931) =

British vessel that sunk in 1944

History
- Name: 1932–1944: TSS St David
- Operator: 1932–1944: Great Western Railway
- Port of registry: (United Kingdom)
- Builder: Cammell Laird, Birkenhead
- Yard number: 985
- Launched: 10 December 1931
- Completed: 1932
- Fate: Sunk 24 January 1944

General characteristics
- Tonnage: 800 gross register tons (GRT)
- Length: 327.2 feet (99.7 m)
- Beam: 46.7 feet (14.2 m)
- Draught: 17.7 feet (5.4 m)
- Speed: 21 kts

TSS St David was a passenger vessel built for the Great Western Railway in 1931.

== History ==
TSS St David was built by Cammell Laird at Birkenhead as one of a pair of new passenger vessels, the other being TSS St Andrew, and launched on 10 December 1931 by Viscountess Churchill, wife of the chairman of the Great Western Railway. She was set to work on the Fishguard to Rosslare service in replacement of her namesake St David of 1906.

She was requisitioned during the Second World War, and served as a hospital ship. She took part in the Dunkirk Evacuation, but was sunk on 24 January 1944 in the Mediterranean Sea off Anzio, Lazio, Italy. At the time she was loaded with wounded soldiers. Although well-marked and lit in accordance with the laws of war, the ship was sunk by German aircraft. Of the 229 people aboard, 96 were killed.
