= Richard Temple-Nugent-Brydges-Chandos-Grenville =

Richard Temple-Nugent-Brydges-Chandos-Grenville may refer to:

- Richard Temple-Nugent-Brydges-Chandos-Grenville, 1st Duke of Buckingham and Chandos (1776–1839), British landowner and politician
- Richard Temple-Nugent-Brydges-Chandos-Grenville, 2nd Duke of Buckingham and Chandos (1797–1861), British landowner and politician, son of the above
- Richard Temple-Nugent-Brydges-Chandos-Grenville, 3rd Duke of Buckingham and Chandos (1823–1889), British landowner, politician and colonial administrator, son of the above
