= TSS Sambur =

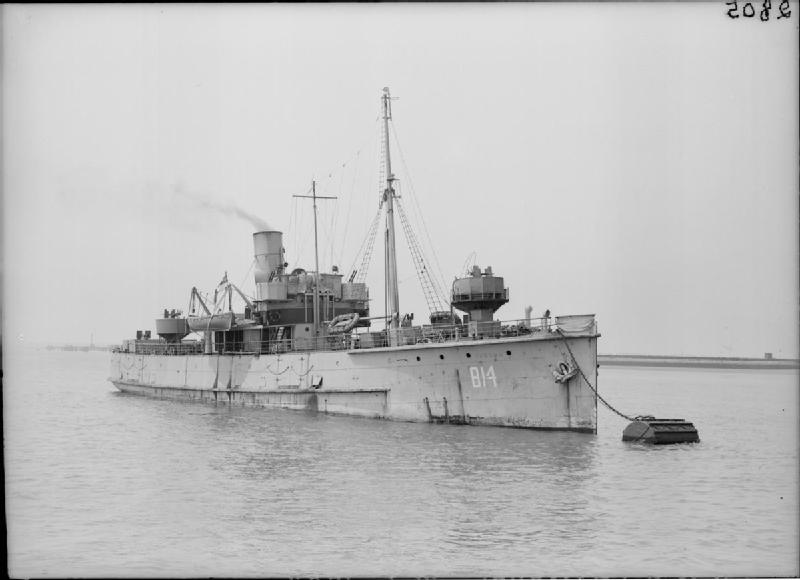
- Sambur as the Toreador

History
- Name: 1925–1942: TSS Sambur; 1942–1945: TSS Toreador; 1945–1964: TSS Sambur
- Operator: 1925–1948: Great Western Railway; 1948–1965: British Railways
- Port of registry: (United Kingdom)
- Route: 1925–1942 & 1945–1964: Weymouth - Channel Isles
- Builder: Swan Hunter and Wigham Richardson
- Yard number: 1206
- Launched: 1925
- Completed: June 1925
- Out of service: 1964
- Fate: Scrapped 1964

General characteristics
- Tonnage: 769 gross register tons (GRT)
- Length: 201.2 feet (61.3 m)
- Beam: 33.7 feet (10.3 m)
- Draught: 10.36 feet (3.16 m)
- Speed: 12 kts

TSS Sambur was a cargo vessel built for the Great Western Railway in 1925.

== History ==
TSS Sambur was built by Swan Hunter and Wigham Richardson as one of a pair of new cargo vessels, the other being TSS Roebuck, and launched in 1925. She was put to work on freight services between the Channel Islands and Weymouth.

in June 1940 she was sent with her sister ship Roebuck to Saint-Valery-en-Caux to assist in the evacuation of the 51st Highland Division. However, by the time they arrived the Germans were already in control of the port and both ships were damaged by gunfire. Subsequently she was requisitioned by the Admiralty for work as a barrage balloon ship in the River Thames and English Channel. In 1942 she was renamed Toreador. She returned to railway service after the war and resumed operation at Weymouth in September 1945 and in 1948 was taken over by British Railways.

She was scrapped in 1964.
