= TSS St Helier =

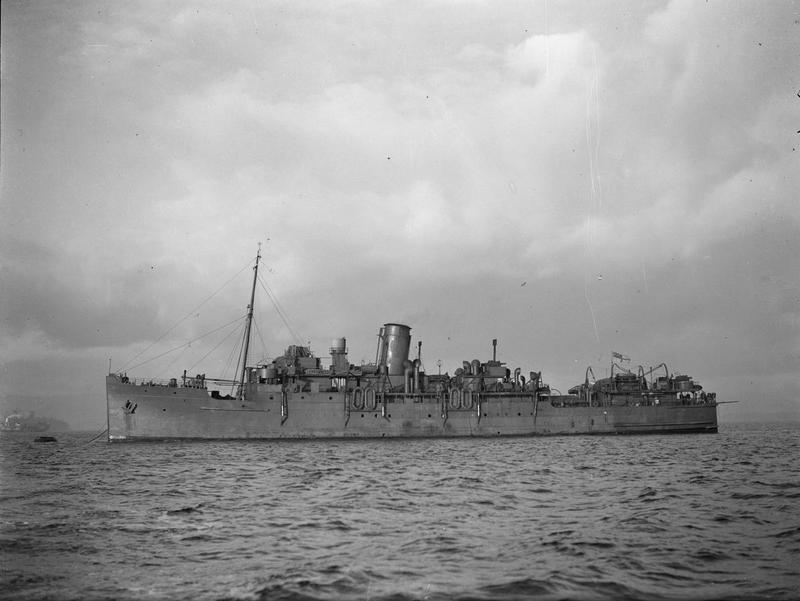
- As HMS St Helier at Greenock, January 1943

History
- Name: 1925–1940: TSS St Helier; 1940–1945: HMS St Helier; 1945–1960: TSS St Helier
- Operator: 1925–1940: Great Western Railway; 1940–1945: Royal Navy; 1945–1947: Great Western Railway; 1948–1960: British Railways
- Port of registry: (United Kingdom)
- Route: 1925–1939: Weymouth - Channel Islands; 1939–1940: Fishguard - Rosslare; 1945–1960: Weymouth - Channel Islands
- Builder: John Brown & Company, Clydebank
- Yard number: 510
- Launched: 26 March 1925
- Out of service: 13 September 1960
- Fate: Scrapped 1960

General characteristics
- Tonnage: 1,885 gross register tons (GRT)
- Length: 282.2 feet (86.0 m)
- Beam: 40 feet (12 m)
- Draught: 13 feet (4.0 m)
- Propulsion: 4 CA Parsons & Company steam turbines
- Speed: 18 knots (33 km/h; 21 mph)
- Capacity: 1004

TSS St Helier was a passenger vessel operated by the Great Western Railway from 1925 until 1948 and British Railways from 1948 until 1960.

== History ==
TSS St Helier was built by John Brown & Company, Clydebank as one of a pair of vessels, with the St Julien for the Weymouth to Channel Islands service. She was launched on 26 March 1925. Initially built with two funnels, one was a dummy and this was removed in 1928.

In 1939 she was transferred to Fishguard to replace the St Andrew which was already in government service, but she too was requisitioned by November for troop movements from Southampton.

She took part in the Dunkirk evacuation in 1940. In all she made one trip to Calais and seven to Dunkirk rescuing 1,500 refugees and 10,200 allied soldiers. Following which the captain and first and second officers were awarded the Distinguished Service Cross, while the quartermaster received the Distinguished Service Medal.

After Dunkirk she saw government service between Gourock and the Isle of Man, transporting prisoners-of-war to camps on the island.

She was then taken over by the Royal Navy as HMS St Helier and moved to Dartmouth to support Motor Torpedo Boats before being converted to an assault ship LSI(H) for the D-Day landings. To the end of her career she retained the oversized davits fitted to carry landing craft.

She then returned to Weymouth for further railway service until being retired on 13 September 1960. On 19 December 1960 she arrived in Antwerp for breaking up by Jos de Smedt.
