= TSS St Andrew =

History
- Name: 1932–1967: TSS St Andrew
- Operator: 1932–1948: Great Western Railway; 1948–1967: British Railways
- Port of registry: (United Kingdom)
- Builder: Cammell Laird, Birkenhead
- Yard number: 984
- Launched: 10 November 1931
- Completed: 1932
- Out of service: 1967
- Fate: Scrapped 1967

General characteristics
- Tonnage: 800 gross register tons (GRT)
- Length: 327.2 feet (99.7 m)
- Beam: 46.7 feet (14.2 m)
- Draught: 17.7 feet (5.4 m)
- Speed: 21 kts

TSS St Andrew was a passenger vessel built for the Great Western Railway in 1931.

== History ==
TSS St Andrew was built by Cammell Laird at Birkenhead as one of a pair of new passenger vessels, the other being TSS St David, and launched in November 1931.

She was set to work on the Fishguard to Rosslare service in replacement of her namesake St Andrew of 1908.

She was requisitioned by the Admiralty in the Second World War as a hospital ship, taking part in the evacuation of Dunkirk in 1940. She returned to the Fishguard to Rosslare service in 1946 and continued in service until 1967 when she was scrapped.
