= TrSS St George =

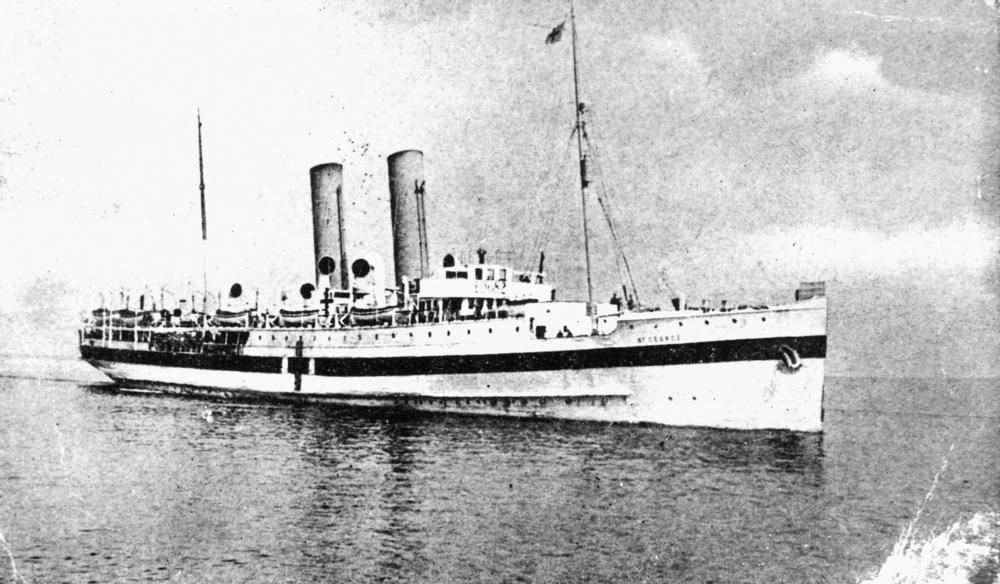
- St George whilst acting as a hospital ship

History
- Name: 1906–1929: TrSS St George
- Operator: 1906–1913: Great Western Railway; 1913–1917: Canadian Pacific Railway; 1919–1929: Great Eastern Railway
- Port of registry: (United Kingdom)
- Route: 1906–1913: Fishguard–Waterford
- Builder: Cammell Laird, Birkenhead
- Yard number: 668
- Launched: 13 January 1906
- Fate: Scrapped October 1929

General characteristics
- Tonnage: 2,500 gross register tons (GRT)
- Propulsion: Triple-screw with Parsons’ direct-drive turbines
- Speed: 22.5 knots
- Capacity: 1,000 passengers

TrSS St George was a passenger vessel built for the Great Western Railway in 1906.

== History ==
She was built by Cammell Laird for the Great Western Railway as one of a trio of new ships which included TrSS St Patrick and TrSS St David. She was launched on 13 January 1906 by Mrs David MacIver, and later that year started work on the new Fishguard to Waterford service.

In May 1913 she was sold to the Canadian Pacific Railway. In 1917 she was requisitioned by the Canadian Government and acted as a hospital ship. In 1919 the Canadian Pacific Railway sold her to the Great Eastern Railway where she operated services to and from Harwich.

She was scrapped in October 1929 by Hughes-Bolckow Shipbreaking Company in Blyth.
