= PS Great Western (1864) =

History
- Name: 1867–1891: PS Great Western; 1892–1904: PS Lovedale
- Operator: 1867–1872: Ford and Jackson; 1872–1890: Great Western Railway; 1890–1891: Nathaniel Miller, Preston; 1891–1904: David MacBrayne
- Port of registry: (United Kingdom)
- Builder: William Simons and Company, Renfrew
- Yard number: 124
- Launched: 9 March 1864
- Completed: 1867
- Out of service: 1904
- Fate: Scrapped

General characteristics
- Tonnage: 454 gross register tons (GRT)
- Length: 220.4 ft (67.2 m)
- Beam: 25.2 ft (7.7 m)
- Installed power: 190 hp
- Propulsion: 2 cylinder compound oscillating engine

PS Great Western was a passenger vessel built for Ford and Jackson in 1867 and then used by the Great Western Railway from 1872 to 1890.

== History ==
She was built by William Simons of Renfrew and launched on 9 March 1864. She was completed in 1867 and owned by Ford and Jackson and deployed on their Milford to Cork route. She was a twin-funnel sister to the PS South of Ireland.

In 1872 she was purchased by the Great Western Railway. In 1887 she was chartered to the Weymouth and Channel Islands Steam Packet Company. On 15 August 1888, she ran aground at Weymouth. In 1893 she was rebuilt with one funnel.

She was obtained by David MacBrayne in 1891 and put on the Stromeferry to Stornoway route. She was renamed PS Lovedale in 1893. On 13 November 1893 she was involved in a collision with the SS Brook off Broadford, Isle of Skye, which resulted in a court case for damages.

She ended her career freighting sheep from Islay to Glasgow, and her master, Lachlan McTavish was convicted at Glasgow Central Police Court with causing unnecessary suffering to the sheep. She was licensed for 750 sheep but was carrying 1170 aboard. Three sheep were suffocated.

In 1904 she was towed into Port Ellen with a broken crankshaft and was scrapped.
