= TSS Sir Richard Grenville (1891) =

History
- Name: 1891–1930: TSS Sir Richard Grenville; 1930–1931: TSS Penlee; 1932–1976: TSS Lady Savile
- Operator: 1891–1931: Great Western Railway; 1931–1947: Dover Harbour Board; 1947–1976: Essex Yacht Club
- Port of registry: (United Kingdom)
- Builder: Cammell Laird, Birkenhead
- Yard number: 583
- Launched: 1891
- Out of service: 1976
- Fate: Scrapped

General characteristics
- Tonnage: 420 gross register tons (GRT)
- Length: 132 feet (40 m)
- Beam: 30.1 feet (9.2 m)
- Draught: 12.5 feet (3.8 m)
- Speed: 12.5 knots

TSS Sir Richard Grenville was a passenger tender vessel built for the Great Western Railway in 1891.

== History ==
TSS Sir Richard Grenville was built by Cammell Laird and launched in 1891. She left the Mersey on 30 April 1891. She was intended as a tender to meet the large mail steamers frequenting Plymouth, and also as an excursion steamer along the coast.

She was advertised for sale in 1921 but was eventually returned to service until sold in 1931, renamed Penlee to make way for a replacement Sir Richard Grenville then moved on to the Dover Harbour Board where she was renamed a second time to Lady Savile.

She was purchased by the Essex Yacht Club in 1947 as their Clubship and moved to Leigh-on-Sea in Essex. She was replaced in 1976 by the Trinity House Pilot cutter Bembridge and was broken up at Queenborough, Sheppey.
