= PS Milford =

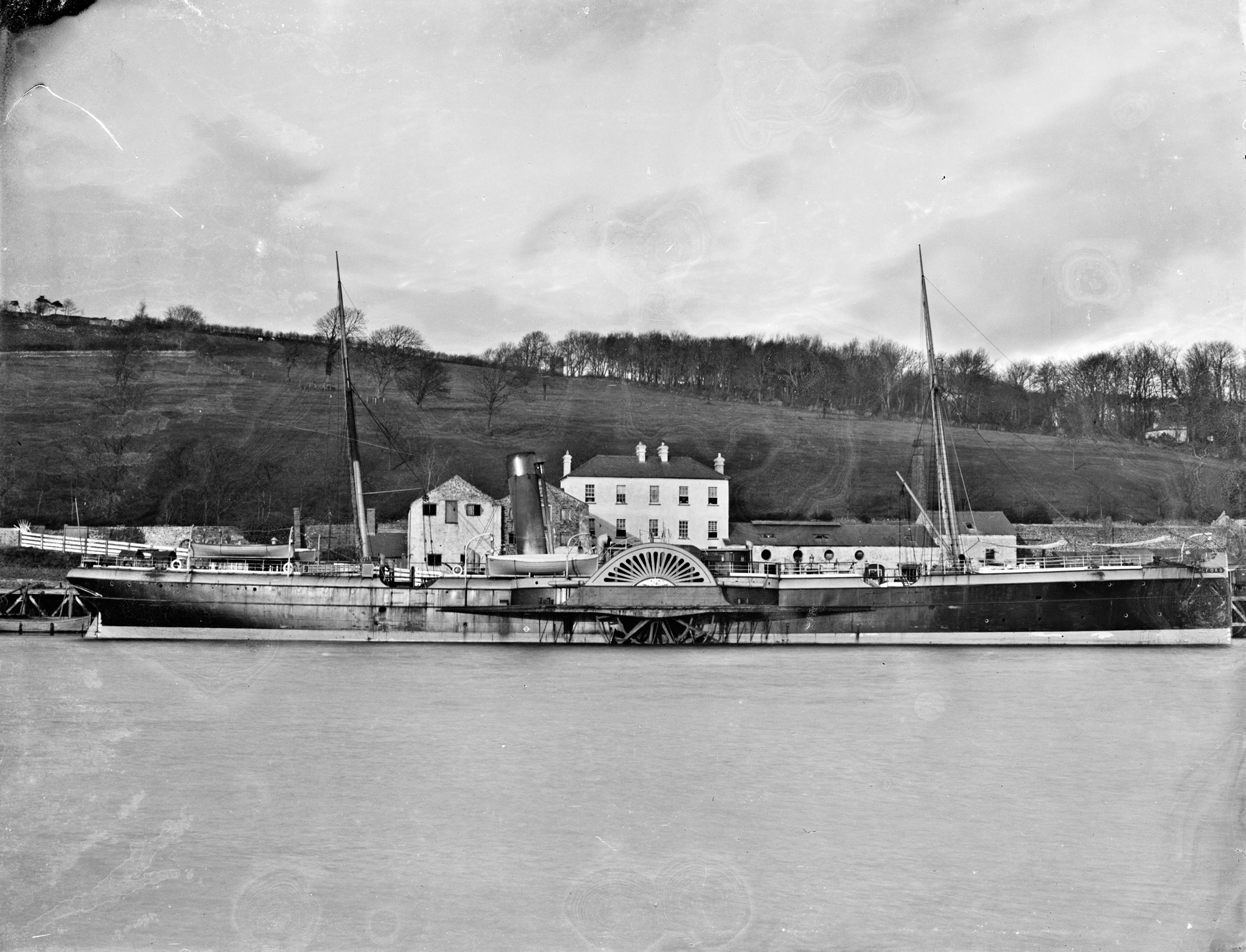
- PS Milford pictured at the North Wharf, Waterford

History
- Name: 1873–1901: PS Milford
- Operator: 1873–1901: Great Western Railway
- Port of registry: (United Kingdom)
- Route: Milford Haven - Waterford
- Builder: William Simons and Company, Renfrew
- Yard number: 176
- Launched: 9 August 1873
- Fate: Scrapped 1901

General characteristics
- Tonnage: 914 gross register tons (GRT)
- Length: 251.8 feet (76.7 m)
- Beam: 29.2 feet (8.9 m)

PS Milford was a passenger vessel built for the Great Western Railway in 1873.

== History ==
PS Milford was one of a pair of ships ordered from William Simons and Company of Renfrew, the other being PS Limerick. She was built under the superintendence of Mr Glover, the consulting engineer of the Great Western Railway and launched on 9 August 1873 by Miss Brown. She undertook sea trials October and on 20 October 1873 was reported as proceeding along the River Clyde at a speed of 14.3 knots, despite a heavy swell and severe gale.

On 22 July 1874 she ran down an unknown vessel off St Ann’s head during a voyage from Waterford to New Milford.

She was scrapped in 1901.
