= TSS St David (1947) =

History
- Name: 1947–1971: TSS St David; 1971–????: TSS Holyhead
- Operator: 1947–1948: Great Western Railway; 1948–1971: British Railways
- Port of registry: (United Kingdom)
- Route: 1947–1969: Fishguard - Rosslare; 1969–1971: Holyhead - Dun Laoghaire
- Builder: Cammell Laird, Birkenhead
- Yard number: 1185
- Launched: 6 February 1947
- Fate: Scrapped 1979

General characteristics
- Tonnage: 3,352 gross register tons (GRT)

TSS St David was a passenger vessel built for the Great Western Railway in 1947 and operated by British Railways from 1948. She was sold in 1971 to Handris Lines of Greece and was renamed Holyhead, but never entered service and was scrapped in 1979.

== History ==
The St David was built by Cammell Laird, Birkenhead in 1947 as one of a pair of vessels with St Patrick. St David was launched on 6 February 1947 by the Countess of Dudley, wife of the deputy chairman of the Great Western Railway. She entered service at Fishguard in July 1947.

In 1969 she was transferred to the Holyhead to Dun Laoghaire service. In 1971 she was sold to Greek owner Handris Lines and was renamed Holyhead. She never entered service under Handris ownership and was scrapped in 1979.
