= TSS Sir Richard Grenville (1931) =

History
- Name: 1931–1963: TSS Sir Richard Grenville; 1963–1969: TSS La Duchesse de Normandie
- Operator: 1831–1948: Great Western Railway; 1948–1963: British Railways; 1963: Devon Cruising Company Limited; 1963–1969: Jersey Lines Company Limited
- Port of registry: (United Kingdom)
- Builder: Earle’s Shipbuilding and Engineering Company, Hull
- Launched: 18 June 1931
- Out of service: 1969
- Fate: Scrapped 1969

General characteristics
- Tonnage: 896 gross register tons (GRT)
- Length: 172.6 feet (52.6 m)
- Beam: 42.6 feet (13.0 m)
- Draught: 14.6 feet (4.5 m)

TSS Sir Richard Grenville was a passenger tender vessel built for the Great Western Railway in 1931.

== History ==
TSS Sir Richard Grenville was built by Earle's Shipbuilding and Engineering Company in Hull and launched on 18 June 1931. She was a replacement for the ship of the same name dating from 1891. She was one of a pair built for tendering duties in Plymouth harbour, her sister TSS Sir John Hawkins being launched two years later.

During World War II she was used by the Admiralty at Plymouth, Scapa Flow and Pentland Firth.

After returning to railway service early in 1946 she resumed service at Plymouth until 31 October 1963, the last tender in use at that dock.

She eventually found a new owner and was renamed La Duchesse de Normandie for services around the Channel Islands. She was sent for scrapping in 1969.
