= TSS Antelope =

History
- Name: 1889–1913: Antelope; 1913–1933: Antromitos
- Operator: 1889–1913: Great Western Railway; 1913–1933: Greek owner
- Port of registry: (United Kingdom)
- Builder: Laird Brothers, Birkenhead
- Yard number: 572
- Launched: 4 May 1889
- Out of service: 1933
- Fate: Scrapped 1933 in Italy

General characteristics
- Tonnage: 880 GRT
- Length: 235 ft (72 m)
- Beam: 27.5 ft (8.4 m)
- Draught: 11 ft (3.4 m)
- Depth: 14 ft (4.3 m)

TSS Antelope was a passenger vessel built for the Great Western Railway in 1889.

== History ==
She was built by Laird Brothers at Birkenhead as one of a trio of new ships for the Great Western Railway as a twin-screw steamer for the Channel Island Services. The other ships were TSS Gazelle and TSS Lynx. The new steamer was launched on 4 May 1889 and named by Miss MacIver, daughter of Mr. David MacIver of Woodslee, one of the directors of the company. She made her inaugural voyage between Weymouth and the Channel Islands on 17 July 1889.

In 1913 she was sold to a Greek owner and renamed Antromitos. She was broken up in Italy in 1933.
