= TSS St Julien =

History
- Name: 1925–1960: TSS St Julien
- Operator: 1925–1948: Great Western Railway; 1948–1960: British Railways
- Port of registry: (United Kingdom)
- Route: 1925–1939: Weymouth - Channel Isles; 1945–1960: Weymouth - Channel Isles
- Builder: John Brown & Company, Clydebank
- Yard number: 509
- Launched: 23 February 1925
- Out of service: 12 April 1961
- Fate: Scrapped 1961

General characteristics
- Tonnage: 1,885 gross register tons (GRT)
- Length: 282.2 feet (86.0 m)
- Beam: 40 feet (12 m)
- Draught: 13 feet (4.0 m)
- Propulsion: 4 CA Parsons & Company steam turbines
- Speed: 18 knots

TSS St Julien was a passenger vessel operated by the Great Western Railway from 1925 until 1948 and British Railways from 1948 until 1960.

== History ==
St Julien was built by John Brown & Company, Clydebank as one of a pair of vessels, with the St Helier for the Weymouth to Channel Islands service. She arrived in Weymouth on 4 May 1925. She had two funnels, but one was a dummy and was removed in 1928.

In September 1927, during a voyage to Weymouth, the St. Julien's captain, Charles Hamon Langdon, was found dead in his cabin. On 1 October 1937 she went to the assistance of the French steamer Briseis which had struck the rocks near Grand Roccque, Guernsey.

After World War II broke out in 1939, she was put to use ferrying troops but very quickly converted into a hospital ship. She took part in the evacuation of British troops from Dunkirk and Cherbourg in 1940. She spent the remainder of the war as a hospital ship, including a period operating in the Mediterranean and supporting the D-Day landings. She was damaged by a mine on 7 June 1944 but repaired and resumed service on 24 June 1944.

Afterwards she returned to Weymouth for further railway service which lasted until 27 September 1960. She was sent to Van Heyghen Freres, Ghent in March 1961 for scrapping.
