= TrSS St Patrick =

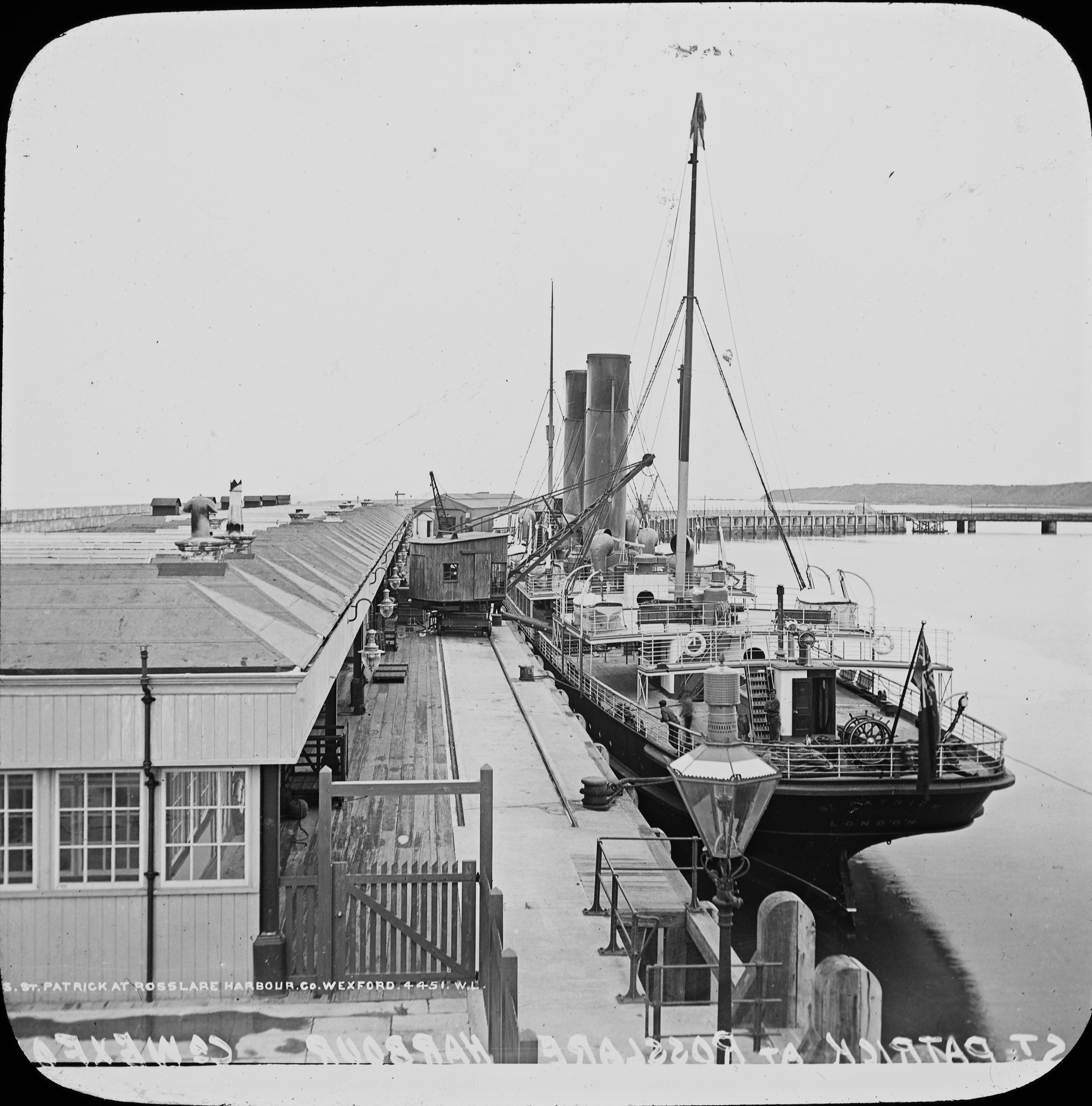
- St. Patrick at Rosslare Harbour, c.1910

History

United Kingdom
- Name: 1906–1929: TrSS St Patrick
- Operator: 1906–1929: Great Western Railway
- Port of registry: (United Kingdom)
- Builder: John Brown and Company
- Yard number: 371
- Launched: 24 February 1906
- Out of service: 7 April 1929
- Fate: Destroyed by fire, 7 April 1929

General characteristics
- Tonnage: 2,531 gross register tons (GRT)
- Length: 350 feet (110 m)
- Beam: 41 feet (12 m)
- Propulsion: Triple-screw with Parsons’ direct-drive turbines
- Speed: 23 knots

TrSS St Patrick was a passenger vessel built for the Great Western Railway in 1906.

== History ==
She was built by John Brown and Company for the Great Western Railway as one of a trio of new ships which included TrSS St George and TrSS St David.

From 1914 to 1919 she was requisitioned by the British Government as a hospital ship for the duration of the First World War.

On 20 August 1927 she was in collision with her sister ship TrSS St David in Fishguard harbour.

She was re-engined in 1926 and caught fire on 7 April 1929. The fire was attributed to an electrical fault following which she was scrapped.
