= Henry Palliser =

Royal Navy Admiral (1839–1907)

Admiral Henry Palliser
- Born: 22 June 1839
- Died: 17 March 1907 (aged 67)
- Military career
- Allegiance: United Kingdom
- Branch: Royal Navy
- Rank: Admiral
- Commands: HMS Victory; Pacific Station

Admiral Henry St Leger Bury Palliser (22 June 1839 – 17 March 1907) was a Royal Navy officer who served as Commander-in-Chief, Pacific Station.

== Naval career ==
Palliser was appointed a Commander in the Royal Navy in 1869. In 1882 he was offered a map purporting to show the location on the Cocos Islands of gold and silver looted from the Mary Dear but, despite looking, he never found anything. Following promotion to captain in 1878, he was given command of HMS Victory in 1891. He was appointed Commodore-in-Charge, Hong Kong from December 1891 to June 1893. He was next appointed Commander-in-Chief, Pacific Station in 1896. He was placed on the retired list in June 1899, and promoted to vice-admiral on 13 July 1899. Promoted to full admiral on the Retired list in 1904, he died in 1907. He was buried at Everton Church in Bedfordshire.

Military offices
| Preceded by Sir Henry Stephenson | Commander-in-Chief, Pacific Station; 1896–1899 | Succeeded by Sir Lewis Beaumont |
