= TSS Great Western (1933) =

History
- Name: 1933–1966: TSS Great Western
- Operator: 1933–1948: Great Western Railway; 1948–1966: British Railways
- Port of registry: (United Kingdom)
- Builder: Cammell Laird, Birkenhead
- Yard number: 998
- Launched: 21 November 1933
- Out of service: 1966
- Fate: Scrapped 1967

General characteristics
- Tonnage: 1,600 gross register tons (GRT)
- Length: 282.75 feet (86.18 m)
- Beam: 40.33 feet (12.29 m)
- Draught: 16.07 feet (4.90 m)
- Installed power: 306 hp
- Speed: 14 kts

TSS Great Western was a passenger vessel built for the Great Western Railway in 1933.

== History ==
She was built in 1933 to replace an earlier ship of the same name, which had operated from Fishguard, a coastal town in Pembrokeshire, Wales, to Rosslare Harbour in Wexford, Ireland, since 1902. She was launched on 21 November, 1933 by Lady Cadman, wife of Sir John Cadman, a director of the Great Western Railway, and had an experimental type of coal firing with mechanical stokers and a forced draught system, intended to be more economical than oil.

From April to August in 1944, she performed as a troop ship, but returned to service and continued until 1966 when the service was abandoned
