= TrSS St David =

History
- Name: 1906–1932: TrSS St David; 1932–1933: TrSS Rosslare
- Operator: 1906–1933: Great Western Railway
- Port of registry: (United Kingdom)
- Route: 1906–1932: Fishguard–Rosslare
- Builder: John Brown and Company
- Yard number: 370
- Launched: 25 January 1906
- Fate: Scrapped September 1933

General characteristics
- Tonnage: 2,529 gross register tons (GRT)
- Length: 350.8 feet (106.9 m)
- Beam: 41.1 feet (12.5 m)
- Propulsion: Triple-screw with Parsons' direct-drive turbines
- Speed: 23 knots

TrSS St David was a passenger vessel built for the Great Western Railway in 1906.

== History ==
She was built by John Brown and Company for the Great Western Railway as one of a trio of new ships which included TrSS St George and TrSS St Patrick.

From 1914 to 1919 she was requisitioned by the British Government as a hospital ship for the duration of the First World War.

She was re-engined in 1925.

On 20 August 1927 she was in collision with her sister ship TrSS St Patrick in Fishguard harbour.

In 1932 she was renamed Rosslare, to allow for a successor vessel to be named St Patrick. She was scrapped in September 1933.
