= List of London and North Western Railway ships =

== Holyhead services ==
The London and North Western Railway operated a number of ships on Irish Sea crossings between Holyhead and Dublin, Howth or Kingstown.

Ship	Launched	Tonnage (GRT)	Notes and references
Admiral Moorsom	1860	747 (1860–68); 794 (1868–85)	Sank in 1885 after a collision.
Alexandra	1863	703 (1863–70); 828 (1870- )	Sold in 1889 to F Schultze, Rostock. Converted to a barque and renamed Elise Schultze.
Anglesey	1888	980	
Anglia	1847	473	Acquired in 1859 from the Chester and Holyhead Railway, in service until 1861. Used as a blockade runner by the Confederate States of America. Captured in 1862 by the Union and renamed Admiral Dupont.
Anglia	1899	1,862	Hit a mine and sank, 17 November 1915.
Anglia	1920	3,460	Scrapped in 1935.
Arvonia	1920	1,842	Renamed from Cambria in 1920. Scrapped in 1925.
Banshee	1884	1,109 (1884–94); 1,250 (1894–1906)	Scrapped in 1906.
Cambria	1848	590 (1848–61); 759 (1861–84)	Acquired from the Chester and Holyhead Railway in 1859. Lengthened by 37 feet (11.28 m) in 1861. Scrapped in 1884.
Cambria	1889	357	
Cambria	1897	1,842	Requisitioned by the Royal Navy in 1914 and used as an Armed Boarding Ship. Converted to a Hospital ship in 1915. Returned to LNWR in 1918. Renamed Arvonia in 1920.
Cambria	1920	3,445	Renamed Cambria II in 1948, scrapped in 1949.
Cloghmore	1896	1,488	Ex Greenore, renamed in 1912.
Connemara	1896	1,106	Collided on 3 November 1906 with SS Retriever and sank with the loss of 86 lives. Retriever also sank with the loss of eight of her nine crew.
Countess of Erne	1868	825	Sold in 1889 to Bristol General Steam Navigation Company Ltd. Sank in Portland Harbour in 1935.
Curraghmore	1919	1,587	Renamed Duke of Abercorn in 1930.
Dodder			Carlingford Lough pleasure steamer. Sank in 1873 after a collision with Duchess of Erne. Raised in 1874 and returned to service.
Duchess of Sutherland	1869	761 (1869–88); 848 (1888–1908)	Scrapped in 1908.
Duke of Sutherland	1868	893	Scrapped in 1886.
Earl Spencer	1874	858 (1874–84); 909 (1884–96)	Scrapped in 1896.
Edith	1870	749 (1870–92); 837 (1892–1912)	Built as a paddle steamer. Collided with Duchess of Sutherland, in Holyhead harbour in September 1875 and sank. Salvaged in 1877 rebuilt as a cargo ship. Further rebuild in 1892 as a screw-propelled ship. Sold for scrap in 1912 but resold to Belgian owner. Seized by Belgian Government in 1913 on suspicion of gun running. Scrapped in 1914.
Eleanor	1873	917	Ran aground on 27 January 1881 at Leestone Point, Kilkeel, Ireland.
Eleanor	1881	854	Scrapped in 1902.
Galtee More	1898	1,105	Scrapped in 1926.
Greenore	1896		Renamed Cloghmore in 1912.
Greenore	1912	1,488	Scrapped in 1926.
Hercules	1838	300	Acquired from the Chester and Holyhead Railway in 1859.
Hibernia	1847	573	Acquired from the Chester and Holyhead Railway in 1859. Sold in 1877 to the Waterford and Limerick Railway.
Hibernia	1899	1,862	Requisitioned by the Royal Navy in 1915 as HMS Tara. Torpedoed and sunk by U-35 on 5 November 1915 in Sollum Bay, Mediterranean Sea.
Hibernia	1920	3,467	Renamed Hibernia II in 1948, scrapped in 1949.
Holyhead	1883	931	Collided on 31 October 1883 with Alhambra off Anglesey and sank.
Irene	1885	989	
Isabella	1877	842 (187-88); 899 (1888–98)	Scrapped in 1898.
Lily	1880	1,035 (1880–91); 1,144 (1891- )	Sold in 1900 to Liverpool and Douglas Steamers Ltd.
Menevia	1902	1,872	Renamed from Scotia in 1920. Sold in 1928 to the Isle of Man Steam Packet Company.
Mersey	1869		Sold in 1897 to J J King, Garston.
North Wall	1883	931	Scrapped in December 1904 at Preston.
Ocean	1853	507	
Olga	1887	970	
Queen	1845		Acquired in 1859 from the Chester and Holyhead Railway.
Rathmore	1908	1,569	Sank on 4 May 1914 after a collision, later salvaged and repaired. Renamed Lorain in 1927. Scrapped in 1932.
Rose	1876	1,186 (1876–87); 1,269 (1887–94)	Scrapped in 1894.
Rosstrevor	1895	1,094	Scrapped in 1926.
Sea Nymph	1845		Acquired in 1859 from the Chester and Holyhead Railway.
Severn	1869		Purchased in 1880. Sold in 1897 to Thos. W. Ward.
Scotia	1847	179	Acquired in 1859 from the Chester and Holyhead Railway. In service until 1861. Used as a blockade runner by the Confederate States of America. Captured in 1862 by the Union and renamed General Banks.
Scotia	1902	1,872	Requisitioned in 1914, returned to LNWR in 1917. Renamed Menevia in 1920.
Scotia	1921	3,441	Bombed and sunk on 1 June 1940 at Dunkirk, over 330 lives lost.
Shamrock	1876	1,186 (1876–86); 1,266 (1886–98)	Scrapped in 1898.
Slieve Bawn	1905	1,148	Scrapped in 1935.
Slieve Bloom	1907	1,166	Sank on 20 March 1918 off Anglesey after a collision with USS Stockton.
Slieve Donard	1921	1,116	Scrapped in 1954.
Slieve Gallion	1907	1,166	Scrapped in 1937.
Slieve More	1904	1,138	Scrapped in 1932.
Snowdon	1902	1,110	Scrapped in 1935.
South Stack	1900	1,066	Scrapped in 1931.
Stanley	1864	782 (1864–72); 792 (1872-)	Sold in 1888 to Irish National Steamboat Co Ltd.
Telegraph	1853	848	Acquired in 1859 from the Chester and Holyhead Railway. Ran aground on 27 January 1881 at Cooley Point, Ireland. Salvaged but beyond economical repair and scrapped.
Violet	1880	1,035 (1880–91); 1,175 (1891- )	Sold in 1902 to Liverpool and Douglas Steamers Ltd.

== Fleetwood services ==
The LNWR also operated a joint service with the Lancashire & Yorkshire Railway from Fleetwood to Belfast and Derry.

Ship	Launched	Tonnage (GRT)	Notes and references
Colleen Bawn	1903	1,204	Relegated to cargo service in 1914. Scrapped in 1931.
Duke of Albany	1907	2,259	Requisitioned by the Royal Navy as HMS Duke of Albany, an Armed Boarding Vessel. Torpedoed and sunk in 1916.
Duke of Argyll	1909	2,052	Sold in 1927 to Angleterre-Lorraine-Alsace and renamed Alsace. Scrapped in 1937 at Altenwerder, Germany.
Duke of Clarence	1892	1,458	Requisitioned by the Admiralty in 1914, returned to LNWR in 1920. Scrapped in 1930.
Duke of Connaught	1,082	Scrapped in 1893	
Duke of Connaught	1902	1,680	Scrapped in 1934.
Duke of Cornwall	1898	1,540	Sold in 1928 to Isle of Man Steam Packet Company, renamed Rushen Castle. Scrapped in 1948.
Duke of Cumberland	1909	2,052	Sold in 1927 to Angleterre-Lorraine-Alsace, renamed Picard. Sold in 1936 to A Anghelatos, Greece and renamed Heliopolis. Scrapped at Genoa, Italy in 1939.
Duke of Lancaster	1895	1,520	Sold to Isle of Man Steam Packet Company in 1912, renamed The Ramsey. Requisitioned by the Royal Navy in 1914. Sank in August 1915 by Meteor.
Duke of York	1894	1,473	Sold to Isle of Man Steam Packet Company in 1912 and renamed Peel Castle. Sold in 1930. Scrapped in 1939 at Dalmuir, West Dunbartonshire.
Earl of Ulster	1878	1,107	Sold in 1894 to Harland & Wolff
Iverna	1895	995	Acquired with the takeover of Drogheda Steam Packet Company in 1902. Scrapped in 1912.
Kathleen Mavourneen	1885	988	Acquired with the takeover of Drogheda Steam Packet Company in 1902. Scrapped in 1903.
Lune	1892	253	Used for pleasure trips to Blackpool and Morecambe. Sold to Cosens & Co in 1913, renamed Melcombe Regis. Scrapped in 1920.
Mellifont	1903	1,204	Scrapped in 1933
Norah Creina	1878	894	Acquired with the takeover of Drogheda Steam Packet Company in 1902. Scrapped in 1912.
Prince Arthur	1864	708	Built as Sheffield for Liverpool & Dublin Steam Navigation Co Ltd. Bought in 1870 and renamed. Sold in 1877 to T Seed Ltd, Fleetwood.
Prince of Wales	1886	1,429>	Sold in 1896 to Spain.
Princess of Wales	1870	936	Scrapped in 1896.
Royal Consort	1844	522	Built in 1844 for North Lancashire Steam Navigation Company Ltd. Bought in 1870, scrapped in 1893.
Thomas Dugdale	1873	1,000	Sold in 1883 to Irish National Steamship Co Ltd.
Tredagh	1876	901	Acquired with the takeover of Drogheda Steam Packet Company in 1902. Scrapped in 1904.
