= List of shipping facilities of the London, Midland and Scottish Railway =

A list of the shipping facilities of the London, Midland and Scottish Railway is shown below:

Location	Pre-grouping company
Alloa	CR
Ayr	G&SWR
Barrow	FR
Bowling	CR
Bristol (Avonside and Kings Wharf)	MR
Deganwy Quay	LNWR
Fairlie (Clyde Pier)	G&SWR
Fleetwood	LNWR & L&YR Joint
Foryd Pier	LNWR
Garston	LNWR
Gourock (Clyde Pier)	CR
Grangemouth	CR
Gravesend (Town and West St Piers)	MR
Heysham	MR
Highbridge	S&DJR
Holyhead	LNWR
Kyle of Lochalsh	HR
Largs (Clyde Pier)	G&SWR
Lydney	S&WJR
Oban (Railway Pier)	CR
Poplar	MR
Poplar	NLR
Renfrew (Clyde Pier)	G&SWR
Stranraer	P&WJR
Tilbury (Riverside) landing stage	MR
Troon	G&SWR
Wemyss Bay (Clyde Pier)	CR
Wyre Dock	LNWR (L&YR)

== List of ships of the London, Midland and Scottish Railway ==
Vessel Name	Built by	Launched	Usual route	Notes	GRT
Cambria	LMS	1949	Holyhead-Dublin	Ordered by the LMS, but by the time she arrived, the LMS had been incorporated into the British Transport Commission. 1976 sold to Saudi Arabia, renamed Altaif	4,972
Duke of Argyll	LMS	1928	Heysham-Belfast	Renamed Duke of Argyll II in 1955. Scrapped in 1956.	3,604
Duke of Lancaster	LMS	1928	Heysham-Belfast	Renamed Duke of Lancaster II in 1955. Scrapped in 1956.	3,608
Duke of Rothesay	LMS	1928	Heysham-Belfast	Renamed Duke of Rothesay II in 1955. Scrapped in 1956.	3,606
Duke of York	LMS	1935	Heysham-Belfast	War service 1939-1945 including Normandy landings. Re-fitting completed in 1947 after a delay and re-entered Heysham-Belfast service that year. Transferred to Harwich-Hook of Holland service in May 1948. Sold in 1963 for conversion to a cruise vessel. Broken up in 1976.	3,743
Glen Sannox	LMS	1925	Clyde	Scrapped 1954	690
Hibernia	LMS	1949	Holyhead-Dublin	Ordered by the LMS, but by the time she arrived, the LMS had been incorporated into the British Transport Commission. Sold to Greece in 1976 becoming the Express Apollon	4,973
Hampton Ferry	LMS	1934	Dover-Dunkirk, Stranraer-Larne	Owned by Southern Railway, requisitioned as HMS Hampton 1939. Used on Stranraer-Larne route 1940–44. Returned to Southern Railway 1947. Sold to Bermuda in 1969 becoming the Tre-Addur.	2,839
Princess Margaret	LMS	1931	Stranraer-Larne	Sold to Hong Kong in 1962 becoming the Macau	2,523
Princess Maud	LMS	1933	Stranraer-Larne	Sold to Cyprus in 1965 becoming the Venus	2,886
Princess Victoria	LMS	1939		HMS Princess Victoria was part of the Humber Force and was involved primarily in the laying of the East Coast barrier to protect the convoys. Sunk by a mine on 19 May 1940 off the River Humber.	2,197
Princess Victoria	LMS	1946	Stranraer-Larne	Capsized and sank in a severe storm in January 1953	2,197
Slieve Bawn	LMS	1937	Dublin-Holyhead	Scrapped 1972	1,573
Slieve Bearnagh	LMS	1936	Heysham-Belfast	Scrapped 1972	1,450
Slieve Bloom	LMS	1930	Heysham-Belfast	Scrapped 1965	1,297
Slieve League	LMS	1935	Dublin-Holyhead	Scrapped 1967	1,343
Slieve More	LMS	1932	Heysham-Belfast	Scrapped 1965	1,409
Duke of Clarence	L&Y	1892	Fleetwood – Belfast, Hull – Zeebrugge, Liverpool - Drogheda	Scrapped 1930	1,458
Aire	GSS	1886		Scrapped 1930	698
Alt	GSS	1911	Goole – Hamburg, Goole-Rotterdam	Scrapped 1954	1,004
Calder	GSS	1887		Scrapped 1931	704
Derwent	GSS	1888	Goole - Rotterdam	Scrapped 1926	830
Hodder	GSS	1910	Goole - Hamburg	Scrapped 1956	1,016
Irwell	GSS	1906		Scrapped 1954	1,040
Mersey	GSS	1906	Goole-Hull-Rotterdam	Sunk by a mine on 20 April 1940	1,037
Nidd	GSS	1900	Goole-Antwerp	Scrapped in 1933	996
Ouse	GSS	1911	Goole-Hamburg	Sunk in 1940 after a collision with SS Rye	1,004
Rother	GSS	1914	Goole-Copenhagen	Scrapped in 1956	986
Wharfe	GSS	1890	Goole-Rotterdam	Scrapped in 1933	914
Duke of Argyll	L&Y and LNWR joint services	1909	Fleetwood-Belfast	Sold to Angleterre-Lorraine-Alsace, renamed Alsacien, in 1927.	2,052
Duke of Connaught	L&Y and LNWR joint services	1902	Fleetwood-Belfast	Scrapped in 1934	1,680
Duke of Cornwall	L&Y and LNWR joint services	1898	Fleetwood-Derry, Fleetwood-Belfast	Sold to the Isle of Man Steam Packet Company in 1928 becoming Rushen Castle	1,540
Duke of Cumberland	L&Y and LNWR joint services	1909	Fleetwood-Belfast	Sold to Angleterre-Lorraine-Alsace, renamed Picard, in 1927.	2,052
Anglia	LNWR	1920	Holyhead-Dublin	Scrapped 1935	3,460
Arvonia	LNWR	1897	Holyhead-Dublin	Was named Cambria until 1920. Scrapped 1925	1,842
Cambria	LNWR	1920	Holyhead-Dublin	Renamed Cambria II in 1948. Scrapped 1949	3,445
Curraghmore	LNWR	1921	Holyhead-Dublin / Greenore	Renamed Duke of Abercorn in 1930. Scrapped 1935	1,587
Galtee More	LNWR	1921	Holyhead-Dublin / Greenore	Scrapped 1926	1,112
Greenore	LNWR	1912	Holyhead-Dublin / Greenore	Scrapped 1926	1,488
Hibernia	LNWR	1912	Holyhead-Dublin	Renamed Hibernia II in 1948. Scrapped 1949	3,458
Rathmore	LNWR	1908	Holyhead-Dublin	Sold to Angleterre-Lorraine-Alsace, renamed Lorrain, in 1927.	1,569
Rosstrevor	LNWR	1895	Holyhead-Dublin / Greenore	Scrapped in 1926	1,065
Menevia	LNWR	1902	Holyhead-Dublin	Sold to the Isle of Man Steam Packet Company in 1928	1,872
Scotia	LNWR	1920	Holyhead-Dublin	Bombed by German aircraft and sunk at Dunkirk on 1 June 1940	3,454
Slieve Bawn	LNWR	1905	Holyhead-Dublin	Scrapped 1935	1,061
Slieve Donard	LNWR	1921	Holyhead-Dublin	Scrapped 1954	1,116
Slieve Gallion	LNWR	1907	Holyhead-Dublin	Scrapped 1937	1,116
Slievemore	LNWR	1904	Holyhead-Dublin	Scrapped 1932	1,053
Snowdon	LNWR	1904	Holyhead-Dublin / Greenore	Scrapped 1935	1,021
South Stack	LNWR	1900	Holyhead-Dublin / Greenore	Scrapped 1931	977
Princess Maud	PWJR	1904	Stranraer - Larne	Scrapped 1932	1,746
Princess Victoria	PWJR	1912	Stranraer - Larne	Scrapped 1934	1,678
Antrim	MR	1904	Heysham-Belfast	Sold to the Isle of Man Steam Packet Company in 1928 becoming Ramsey Town	2,100
City of Belfast	MR	1893	Barrow in Furness - Belfast	Sold to Greece in 1925 becoming Nicolaos Togias	1,055
Duchess of Devonshire	MR	1897	Barrow in Furness - Belfast	Sold to Gibraltar in 1928 becoming Gibel Dersa	1,265
Londonderry	MR	1904	Barrow in Furness - Belfast	Sold to Angleterre-Lorraine-Alsace, renamed Flamand, in 1927.	2,086

== Sources ==
- Haws, Duncan (1993). Merchant Fleets-Britain's Railway Steamers-Eastern & North Western Companies + Zeeland and Stena. Hereford: TCL Publications. ISBN 0-946378-22-3.
- Whitehouse, Patrick; Thomas, David St John (2002) [1987]. LMS 150: The London Midland & Scottish Railway - A century and a half of progress. Newton Abbot: David & Charles. ISBN 0-7153-1378-9.
