= List of ships built by Cammell Laird =

The following is a non-exhaustive list of ships that were built by Cammell Laird, a shipbuilding and repair company founded in 1828 in Birkenhead, England. The ships are listed in order of their launch, grouped into time periods.

== 1800s ==
Ship	Built	Type	Flag	Ref
USS Chatham	1836	Steamer	Confederate States Navy	
HMS Birkenhead	1845	Troop ship	Royal Navy	
PS Cambria	1848	Paddle steamer	United Kingdom	
SS Ellan Vannin	1854	Paddle steamer	Isle of Man	
Denbigh	1860	Paddle steamer	United Kingdom	
Ulster	1860	Paddle steamer	United Kingdom	
CSS Alabama	1862	Sloop	Confederate States Navy	
HMS Orontes	1862	Troop ship	Royal Navy	
PS Alexandra	1863	Paddle steamer	United Kingdom	
HMS Scorpion	1863	Turret ship	Royal Navy	
HMS Wivern	1863	Turret ship	Royal Navy	
CSS Lark	1864	Paddle steamer	Confederate States Navy	
HMS Agincourt	1865	Ironclad	Royal Navy	
Huáscar	1865	Turret ship	Peru	
HMS Euphrates	1866	Troop ship	Royal Navy	
HNLMS Prins Hendrik der Nederlanden	1866	Turret ship	Royal Netherlands Navy	
HNLMS Stier	1868	Monitor	Royal Netherlands Navy	
HMS Captain	1869	Turret ship	Royal Navy	
PS Earl Spencer	1874	Paddle steamer	United Kingdom	
ARA Paraná	1874	Gunboat	Argentine Navy	
ARA Uruguay	1874	Schooner	Argentine Navy	
PS Rose	1876	Paddle steamer	United Kingdom	
PS Shamrock	1876	Paddle steamer	United Kingdom	
PS Isabella	1877	Paddle steamer	United Kingdom	
SS Mona	1878	Packet steamer	Isle of Man	
PS Lily	1880	Paddle steamer	United Kingdom	
SS Pembroke	1880	Ferry	United Kingdom	
PS Violet	1880	Paddle steamer	United Kingdom	
PS Eleanor	1881	Paddle steamer	United Kingdom	
HMS Rattlesnake	1886	Torpedo gunboat	Royal Navy	
TSS Olga	1887	Cargo steamer	United Kingdom	
Colombia	1889	Passenger steamer	Germany	
SS Antelope	1889	Ferry	United Kingdom	
SS Gazelle	1889	Ferry	United Kingdom	
SS Lynx	1889	Ferry	United Kingdom	
Almirante Condell	1890	Torpedo gunboat	Chilean Navy	
Almirante Lynch	1890	Torpedo gunboat	Chilean Navy	
USS Mohican	1890	Patrol vessel	United States Navy	
TSS Ibex	1891	Passenger steamer	United Kingdom	
	1891	Battleship	Argentine Navy	
SS Sir Richard Grenville	1891	Passenger tender	United Kingdom	
TSS Duke of Clarence	1892	Passenger tender	United Kingdom	
ARA Libertad	1892	Battleship	Argentine Navy	
HMS Royal Oak	1892	Battleship	Royal Navy	
TSS City of Belfast	1893	Passenger liner	United Kingdom	
HMS Banshee	1894	Destroyer	Royal Navy	
HMS Contest	1894	Destroyer	Royal Navy	
HMS Dragon	1894	Destroyer	Royal Navy	
HMS Lynx	1894	Destroyer	Royal Navy	
SS Titan	1894	Tug boat	United Kingdom	
HMS Quail	1895	Destroyer	Royal Navy	
HMS Sparrowhawk	1895	Destroyer	Royal Navy	
HMS Thrasher	1895	Destroyer	Royal Navy	
HMS Virago	1895	Destroyer	Royal Navy	
Almirante Simpson	1896	Torpedo gunboat	Chilean Navy	
HMS Earnest	1896	Destroyer	Royal Navy	
HMS Express	1896	Destroyer	Royal Navy	
HMS Griffon	1896	Destroyer	Royal Navy	
RMS Leinster	1896	Mail ship	United Kingdom	
HMS Locust	1896	Destroyer	Royal Navy	
HMS Mars	1896	Battleship	Royal Navy	
RMS Connaught	1897	Mail ship	United Kingdom	
HMS Panther	1897	Destroyer	Royal Navy	
ARA Presidente Sarmiento	1897	Training ship	Argentine Navy	
HMS Seal	1897	Destroyer	Royal Navy	
HMS Wolf	1897	Destroyer	Royal Navy	
HMS Glory	1899	Battleship	Royal Navy	

== 1900-1924 ==
Ship	Built	Type	Flag	Ref
HMS Mutine	1900	Sloop	Royal Navy	
TSS South Stack	1900	Passenger ship	United Kingdom	
HMS Exmouth	1901	Battleship	Royal Navy	
HMS Lively	1901	Destroyer	Royal Navy	
HMS Orwell	1901	Destroyer	Royal Navy	
HMS Sprightly	1901	Destroyer	Royal Navy	
TSS Great Southern	1902	Passenger ship	United Kingdom	
TSS Great Western	1902	Passenger ship	United Kingdom	
HMS Arun	1903	Destroyer	Royal Navy	
HMS Blackwater	1903	Destroyer	Royal Navy	
HMS Foyle	1903	Destroyer	Royal Navy	
HMS Itchen	1903	Destroyer	Royal Navy	
HMS Topaze	1903	Cruiser	Royal Navy	
HMS Liffey	1904	Destroyer	Royal Navy	
HMS Moy	1904	Destroyer	Royal Navy	
HMS Pathfinder	1904	Cruiser	Royal Navy	
HMS Patrol	1904	Cruiser	Royal Navy	
HMS Ouse	1905	Destroyer	Royal Navy	
HMS Stour	1905	Destroyer	Royal Navy	
HMS Test	1905	Destroyer	Royal Navy	
SS Marylebone	1906	Passenger ship	United Kingdom	
SS St George	1906	Ferry	United Kingdom	
HMS Cossack	1907	Destroyer	Royal Navy	
HMS Swift	1907	Destroyer	Royal Navy	
SS Sir Francis Drake	1908	Tug	United Kingdom	
SS Sir Walter Raleigh	1908	Tug	United Kingdom	
HMS Renard	1910	Destroyer	Royal Navy	
TSS Manx Maid	1910	Packet steamer	Isle of Man	
HMS Raccoon	1910	Destroyer	Royal Navy	
SS Sarnia	1910	Passenger vessel	United Kingdom	
SS Snaefell	1910	Packet steamer	Isle of Man	
HMS Wolverine	1910	Destroyer	Royal Navy	
HMS Adamant	1910	Submarine depot ship	Royal Navy	
Aetos	1911	Destroyer	Greece	
SS Chenab	1911	Steam ship	United Kingdom	
Ierax	1911	Destroyer	Greece	
Leon	1911	Destroyer	Greece	
HMS Lapwing	1911	Destroyer	Royal Navy	
HMS Lizard	1911	Destroyer	Royal Navy	
HMS Audacious	1912	Battleship	Royal Navy	
TrSS 1912	1912	Passenger ship	United Kingdom	
SS Kristianiafjord	1912	Passenger liner	Norway	
HMAS Melbourne	1912	Cruiser	Royal Australian Navy	
Panthir	1912	Destroyer	Greece	
SS Bergensfjord	1913	Passenger liner	Norway	
SS Britanica	1913	Reefer	United Kingdom	
SS King Orry	1913	Packet steamer	Isle of Man	
HMS Garland	1913	Destroyer	Royal Navy	
Vasilefs Constantinos	1914	Ocean liner	Greece	
HMS Caroline	1914	Cruiser	Royal Navy	
HMS Abdiel	1915	Minelayer	Royal Navy	
HMS Birkenhead	1915	Cruiser	Royal Navy	
HMS Castor	1915	Cruiser	Royal Navy	
HMS Chester	1915	Cruiser	Royal Navy	
HMS Constance	1915	Cruiser	Royal Navy	
HMS E41	1915	Submarine	Royal Navy	
HMS Gabriel	1915	Flotila leader	Royal Navy	
SS Kalyan	1915	Passenger ship	United Kingdom	
HMS Kempenfelt	1915	Flotilla leader	Royal Navy	
HMS Caledon	1916	Cruiser	Royal Navy	
HMS E42	1916	Submarine	Royal Navy	
HMS E45	1916	Submarine	Royal Navy	
HMS E46	1916	Submarine	Royal Navy	
HMS Grenville	1916	Flotila leader	Royal Navy	
HMS Hoste	1916	Flotila leader	Royal Navy	
HMS Ithuriel	1916	Destroyer	Royal Navy	
HMS L7	1916	Submarine	Royal Navy	
HMS Parker	1916	Flotila leader	Royal Navy	
HMS Saumarez	1916	Flotila leader	Royal Navy	
HMS Seymour	1916	Flotila leader	Royal Navy	
HMS L8	1917	Submarine	Royal Navy	
HMS Valentine	1917	Destroyer	Royal Navy	
HMS Valhalla	1917	Destroyer	Royal Navy	
HMS Bruce	1918	Flotila leader	Royal Navy	
HMS Cairo	1918	Cruiser	Royal Navy	
HMS Campbell	1918	Flotila leader	Royal Navy	
HMS Capetown	1918	Cruiser	Royal Navy	
HMS Douglas	1918	Flotila leader	Royal Navy	
HMS H33	1918	Submarine	Royal Navy	
HMS H34	1918	Submarine	Royal Navy	
HMS R11	1918	Submarine	Royal Navy	
HMS R12	1918	Submarine	Royal Navy	
HMS Mackay	1918	Flotila leader	Royal Navy	
SS Stavangerfjord	1918	Passenger liner	Norway	
HMS Malcolm	1919	Destroyer	Royal Navy	
HMS Scott	1918	Flotila leader	Royal Navy	
SS Manistee (1920)	1920	Dry cargo ship	United Kingdom	
RMS Samaria	1920	Ocean liner	United Kingdom	
SS Zent	1920	Reefer	United Kingdom	
SS Patia	1922	Reefer	United Kingdom	
Nisbet Grammer	1923	Canaller	United States	
SS Casanare	1922	Reefer	United Kingdom	
SS Sarpedon	1923	Passenger steamer	United Kingdom	
SS Darien	1924	Reefer	Panama	
SS De Grasse	1924	Liner	France	

== 1925-1949 ==
Ship	Built	Type	Flag	Ref
SS Aracataca	1925	Reefer	United Kingdom	
USS Cygnus	1925	Cargo ship	United States Navy	
HMS Rodney	1925	Battleship	Royal Navy	
SS Almeda Star	1926	Passenger and cargo liner	United Kingdom	
SS Cristales	1926	Reefer	United Kingdom	
SS Sulaco	1926	Reefer	United Kingdom	
SS Tetala	1926	Reefer	United Kingdom	
SS Andalucia Star	1927	Passenger liner	United Kingdom	
SS Arandora Star	1927	Passenger liner	United Kingdom	
SS Ben-my-Chree	1927	Packet steamer	Isle of Man	
RMS Lady Drake	1928	Passenger liner	Canada	
RMS Lady Hawkins	1928	Passenger liner	Canada	
RMS Lady Nelson	1928	Passenger liner	Canada	
RMS Lady Rodney	1929	Passenger liner	Canada	
RMS Lady Somers	1929	Passenger liner	Canada	
SS Matina	1929	Reefer	United Kingdom	
SS Mopan	1929	Reefer	United Kingdom	
SS Peveril	1929	Packet steamer	Isle of Man	
HMS Phoenix	1929	Submarine	Royal Navy	
SS Sultan Star	1929	Reefer	United Kingdom	
SS Benedict	1930	Passenger liner	United Kingdom	
SS Deemore	1930	Tug	United Kingdom	
SS Platano	1930	Banana boat	Panama	
SS Prince David	1930	Passenger liner	Canada	
SS Prince Henry	1930	Passenger liner	Canada	
SS Prince Robert	1930	Passenger liner	Canada	
HMS Hilary	1931	Passenger liner	United Kingdom	
HMNZS Achilles	1932	Cruiser	Royal New Zealand Navy	
TSS St Andrew	1932	Ferry	United Kingdom	
TSS St David	1932	Ferry	United Kingdom	
HMS Foresight	1933	Destroyer	Royal Navy	
TSS Great Western	1933	Ferry	United Kingdom	
HMAS Southern Cross	1933	Troop ship	Royal Australian Navy	
RMS Clement	1934	Passenger liner	United Kingdom	
HMS Fearless	1934	Destroyer	Royal Navy	
SS Mona's Queen	1934	Packet steamer	Isle of Man	
HMS Salmon	1934	Submarine	Royal Navy	
HMS Sealion	1934	Submarine	Royal Navy	
MV Abosso	1935	Passenger liner	United Kingdom	
HMS Crispin	1935	Cargo ship	Royal Navy	
MV Dunedin Star	1935	Cargo liner	United Kingdom	
SS British Confidence	1936	Oil tanker	United Kingdom	
HMS Hardy	1936	Destroyer	Royal Navy	
HMS Inglefield	1936	Destroyer	Royal Navy	
MV Melbourne Star	1936	Cargo liner	United Kingdom	
HMS Spearfish	1936	Submarine	Royal Navy	
RFA Aldersdale	1937	RFA	Royal Navy	
HMS Ark Royal	1937	Aircraft carrier	Royal Navy	
MV Brisbane Star	1937	Cargo liner	United Kingdom	
SS British Fortitude	1937	Oil tanker	United Kingdom	
SS City of Pretoria	1937	Passenger and cargo liner	United Kingdom	
Misiones	1937	Destroyer	Argentine Navy	
Santa Cruz	1937	Destroyer	Argentine Navy	
HMS Lothian	1938	Troop ship	Royal Navy	
RMS Mauretania	1938	Mail ship	United Kingdom	
HMS Thetis	1938	Submarine	Royal Navy	
HMS Trident	1938	Submarine	Royal Navy	
HMS Atherstone	1939	Destroyer	Royal Navy	
SS British Sincerity	1939	Oil tanker	United Kingdom	
HMS Dido	1939	Cruiser	Royal Navy	
Diloma	1939	Tanker	United Kingdom	
HMS Prince of Wales	1939	Battleship	Royal Navy	
HMS Taku	1939	Submarine	Royal Navy	
HMS Temeraire	1939	Battleship	Royal Navy	
HMS Berkeley	1940	Destroyer	Royal Navy	
HMS Blencathra	1940	Destroyer	Royal Navy	
HMS Brocklesby	1940	Destroyer	Royal Navy	
HMS Charybdis	1940	Cruiser	Royal Navy	
HMS Eskdale	1940	Destroyer	Royal Navy	
HMS Gurkha	1940	Destroyer	Royal Navy	
HMS Talisman	1940	Submarine	Royal Navy	
HMS Thrasher	1940	Submarine	Royal Navy	
HMS Aldenham	1941	Destroyer	Royal Navy	
HMS Argonaut	1941	Cruiser	Royal Navy	
HMS Badsworth	1941	Destroyer	Royal Navy	
HMS Beaufort	1941	Destroyer	Royal Navy	
HMS Belvoir	1941	Destroyer	Royal Navy	
RFA Dewdale	1941	RFA	Royal Navy	
SS Empire Clive	1941	CAM ship	United Kingdom	
SS Empire Flame	1941	CAM Ship	United Kingdom	
HMS Glaisdale	1941	Destroyer	Royal Navy	
HMS Lively	1941	Destroyer	Royal Navy	
HMS Safari	1941	Submarine	Royal Navy	
HMS Tempest	1941	Submarine	Royal Navy	
HMS Thorn	1941	Submarine	Royal Navy	
SS British Promise	1942	Oil tanker	United Kingdom	
SS British Tradition	1942	Oil tanker	United Kingdom	
HMS Cygnet	1942	Sloop	Royal Navy	
HMS Kite	1942	Sloop	Royal Navy	
HMS Raider	1942	Destroyer	Royal Navy	
HMS Rapid	1942	Destroyer	Royal Navy	
HMS Sahib	1942	Submarine	Royal Navy	
HMS Saracen	1942	Submarine	Royal Navy	
HMS Scorpion	1942	Destroyer	Royal Navy	
HMS Scourge	1942	Destroyer	Royal Navy	
HMS Seadog	1942	Submarine	Royal Navy	
HMS Sea Nymph	1942	Submarine	Royal Navy	
HMS Sibyl	1942	Submarine	Royal Navy	
HMS Sickle	1942	Submarine	Royal Navy	
HMS Simoom	1942	Submarine	Royal Navy	
HMS Stubborn	1942	Submarine	Royal Navy	
HMS Surf	1942	Submarine	Royal Navy	
SS British Restraint	1943	Oil tanker	United Kingdom	
MV Empire MacColl	1943	Merchant aircraft carrier	United Kingdom	
HMS Spirit	1943	Submarine	Royal Navy	
HMS Statesman	1943	Submarine	Royal Navy	
HMS Stoic	1943	Submarine	Royal Navy	
HMS Stonehenge	1943	Submarine	Royal Navy	
HMS Storm	1943	Submarine	Royal Navy	
HMS Stratagem	1943	Submarine	Royal Navy	
HMS Sturdy	1943	Submarine	Royal Navy	
HMS Stygian	1943	Submarine	Royal Navy	
HMS Syrtis	1943	Submarine	Royal Navy	
HMS Teazer	1943	Destroyer	Royal Navy	
HMS Tenacious	1943	Destroyer	Royal Navy	
HMS Undaunted	1943	Destroyer	Royal Navy	
HMS Ulysses	1943	Destroyer	Royal Navy	
HMS Venerable	1943	Aircraft carrier	Royal Navy	
HMS Zambesi	1943	Destroyer	Royal Navy	
HMS Affray	1944	Submarine	Royal Navy	
HMS Gravelines	1944	Destroyer	Royal Navy	
HMS Hogue	1944	Destroyer	Royal Navy	
HMS Lagos	1944	Destroyer	Royal Navy	
HMS Scorcher	1944	Submarine	Royal Navy	
HMS Sea Scout	1944	Submarine	Royal Navy	
HMS Selene	1944	Submarine	Royal Navy	
HMS Sidon	1944	Submarine	Royal Navy	
HMS Sleuth	1944	Submarine	Royal Navy	
HMS Solent	1944	Submarine	Royal Navy	
HMS Spearhead	1944	Submarine	Royal Navy	
HMS Spur	1944	Submarine	Royal Navy	
HMS Subtle	1944	Submarine	Royal Navy	
HMS Supreme	1944	Submarine	Royal Navy	
HMS Zealous	1944	Destroyer	Royal Navy	
HMS Aeneas	1945	Submarine	Royal Navy	
HMS Saga	1945	Submarine	Royal Navy	
HMS Sanguine	1945	Submarine	Royal Navy	
HMS Sluys	1945	Destroyer	Royal Navy	
HMS Springer	1945	Submarine	Royal Navy	
HMS Alaric	1946	Submarine	Royal Navy	
SS Argentina Star	1946	Passenger Liner	United Kingdom	
SS King Orry	1946	Packet steamer	Isle of Man	
SS Mona's Queen	1946	Packet steamer	Isle of Man	
SS Brasil Star	1947	Reefer	United Kingdom	
TSS St David	1947	Ferry	United Kingdom	
TSS St Patrick	1947	Ferry	United Kingdom	
TSS Tynwald	1947	Packet steamer	Isle of Man	
SS Uruguay Star	1947	Reefer	United Kingdom	
SS Paraguay Star	1948	Reefer	United Kingdom	
TSS Snaefell	1948	Packet steamer	Isle of Man	

== 1950-1974 ==
Ship	Built	Type	Flag	Ref
HMS Ark Royal	1950	Aircraft carrier	Royal Navy	
SS Mona's Isle	1950	Packet steamer	Isle of Man	
SS Tasmania Star	1950	Reefer	United Kingdom	
SS Hildebrand	1951	Reefer	United Kingdom	
SS Romney	1952	Cargo liner	United Kingdom	
SS Hubert	1954	Liner	United Kingdom	
HMS Whitby	1954	Frigate	Royal Navy	
TSS Manxman	1955	Packet steamer	Isle of Man	
HMS Tenby	1955	Frigate	Royal Navy	
SS San Flaviano	1956	Oil tanker	United Kingdom	
SS San Fortunato	1956	Oil tanker	United Kingdom	
HMS Grampus	1957	Submarine	Royal Navy	
SS Rockhampton Star	1957	Reefer	United Kingdom	
SS Auckland Star	1958	Reefer	United Kingdom	
INS Talwar	1958	Frigate	Indian Navy	
HMS Finwhale	1959	Submarine	Royal Navy	
SS Fremantle Star	1959	Reefer	United Kingdom	
HMS Sealion	1959	Submarine	Royal Navy	
RMS Windsor Castle	1959	Mail ship	United Kingdom	
HMS Devonshire	1960	Destroyer	Royal Navy	
HMS Odin	1960	Submarine	Royal Navy	
MV Royal Daffodil	1961	Ferry	United Kingdom	
HMS Oracle	1961	Submarine	Royal Navy	
CS Retriever	1961	Cable ship	United Kingdom	
HMS Ajax	1962	Frigate	Royal Navy	
TSS Manx Maid	1962	Packet steamer	Isle of Man	
CS Mercury	1962	Cable ship	United Kingdom	
HMS Opossum	1963	Submarine	Royal Navy	
CS Cable Enterprise	1964	Cable ship	United Kingdom	
RMAS Mandarin	1964	Mooring and salvage	Royal Navy	
RMAS Pintail	1964	Mooring and salvage	Royal Navy	
SS Ben-my-Chree	1965	Packet steamer	Isle of Man	
HMS Onyx	1966	Submarine	Royal Navy	
Koningin Juliana	1967	Car / passenger ferry	Netherlands	
MV Lion	1967	Ferry	United Kingdom	
HMS Renown	1967	Nuclear submarine	Royal Navy	
MV Ulster Queen	1967	Ferry	United Kingdom	
HMS Revenge	1968	Nuclear submarine	Royal Navy	
HMS Conqueror	1969	Nuclear submarine	Royal Navy	
MV Gazana	1971	LPG carrier	United Kingdom	
Esso Clyde	1972	Oil tanker	United Kingdom	
Esso Mersey	1972	Oil tanker	United Kingdom	
Oakworth	1972	Bulk carrier	United Kingdom	
Orbita	1972	Bulk carrier	United Kingdom	
Orduna	1972	Bulk carrier	United Kingdom	
Ortega	1972	Bulk carrier	United Kingdom	
HMS Birmingham	1973	Destroyer	Royal Navy	
MV Gambada	1973	LPG carrier	United Kingdom	
SS St Edmund	1973	Ferry	United Kingdom	
RFA Orangeleaf	1973	RFA	Royal Navy	
HMS Coventry	1974	Destroyer	Royal Navy	

== 1975-1999 ==
Ship	Built	Type	Flag	Ref
RFA Appleleaf	1975	RFA	Royal Navy	
RFA Brambleleaf	1976	RFA	Royal Navy	
HMS Liverpool	1980	Destroyer	Royal Navy	
RFA Bayleaf	1981	RFA	Royal Navy	
HMS Edinburgh	1983	Destroyer	Royal Navy	
Sovereign Explorer	1984	Semi-submersible drill rig		
AV-1 (British Gas)	1985	Jack-up accommodation platform		
HMS Campbeltown	1987	Frigate	Royal Navy	
HMS Unseen	1989	Submarine	Royal Navy	
HMS Ursula	1991	Submarine	Royal Navy	
HMS Unicorn	1992	Submarine	Royal Navy	

== 2000s ==
Ship	Built	Type	Flag	Notes	Ref
MS Leka	2001	Ferry	Norway		
MV Sound of Seil	2013	Ferry	United Kingdom		
MV Sound of Soay	2013	Ferry	United Kingdom		
HMS Queen Elizabeth	2014	Aircraft carrier	Royal Navy	The flight deck was built at Lairds and shipped to Rosyth Dockyard for final construction	
HMS Prince of Wales	2016	Aircraft carrier	Royal Navy	The flight deck was built at Lairds and shipped to Rosyth Dockyard for final construction	
RRS Sir David Attenborough	2018	Research vessel	United Kingdom		
Red Kestrel	2019	Freight ferry	United Kingdom		
MV Royal Daffodil	2025	Ferry	United Kingdom		
MV Sound of Scalpay (II)	2025	Ferry	United Kingdom		
HMS Belfast	2025	Frigate	Royal Navy	The 1000-tonne double bottom block was built at Lairds before being shipped to BAE Govan for integrations	
HMS Birmingham	2025	Frigate	Royal Navy	Eight upper units were constructed at Laird's before being shipped to BAE Govan for integrations	
