= SS Anglia =

Anglia was the name of a number of steamships.

- PS Anglia (1847), In service with the London and North Western Railway until 1861.
- SS Anglia (1899), In service with the London and North Western Railway until requisitioned for use as a hospital ship in 1914. Mined and sunk on 17 November 1915.
- TSS Anglia (1920), In service with the London and North Western Railway and London, Midland and Scottish Railway until 1935.
- SS Anglia (1944) a Hansa A type cargo ship in service 1957–74.
