= Rathmore =

Rathmore may refer to:

== Places in the Republic of Ireland ==
- Rathmore, County Cork, a parish including Baltimore, County Cork
- Rathmore, County Kerry
  - Rathmore GAA, the local GAA club
  - Rathmore railway station, station serving the town
- Rathmore, County Kildare
- Rathmore, County Westmeath a townland in the civil parish of Kilmacnevan
- Rathmore, County Wicklow, a settlement in Kilbride, County Wicklow
- Rathmore Church, County Meath
- Rathmore Park, a small housing estate in Raheny, Dublin

== Places in Northern Ireland, UK ==
- Rathmore, Bangor, an area in County Down
- Rathmore Primary School, a state primary school in Bangor, County Down
- Rathmore Grammar School, a Catholic Grammar school in South Belfast
- Rathmore, County Antrim, a townland in the parish of Donegore, County Antrim
- Rathmore, County Fermanagh, a townland in Belleek, County Fermanagh

== Ships ==
- TSS Rathmore (1908), twin screw steamship
