= List of shipwrecks in April 1881 =

The list of shipwrecks in April 1881 includes ships sunk, foundered, grounded, or otherwise lost during April 1881.

== 1 April ==
List of shipwrecks: 1 April 1881
Ship	State	Description
Leopoldine Frade	Germany	The ship was abandoned in the Atlantic Ocean. All on board were rescued by Northern Chief (Flag unknown). Leopoldine Frade was on a voyage from Galveston, Texas, United States to Cork, United Kingdom.

== 2 April ==
List of shipwrecks: 2 April 1881
Ship	State	Description
Avalanche	Norway	The barque foundered in the Atlantic Ocean. Her crew were rescued by the barque Blandina P. (Austria-Hungary). Avalanche was on a voyage from Newport, Monmouthshire, United Kingdom to Saint Lucia.
Goldhunter	United States	The schooner was wrecked on the coast of the Department of Alaska 30 nautical miles (56 km; 35 mi) east of the entrance to "Behring Bay" – probably a reference to Yakutat Bay, which was historically known as "Bering Bay" – after she lost her rudder in a storm. All seven people on board survived.
Marie	United Kingdom	The Thames barge was driven against the pier at Gravesend, Kent and sank.
Speed	(United Kingdom of Great Britain and Ireland) Guernsey	The schooner collided with the steamship Solent (United Kingdom) and sank off the Longships, Cornwall with the loss of her captain. Survivors were rescued by Victua (Flag unknown). Speed was on a voyage from Runcorn, Cheshire to Jersey, Channel Islands.

== 3 April ==
List of shipwrecks: 3 April 1881
Ship	State	Description
Good Luck	France	The fishing trawler ran aground at Salcombe, Devon, United Kingdom. She was refloated and taken in to Salcombe in a severely leaky condition.
United States	United States	The steamship was wrecked near the outer shoal of Cape Romain, South Carolina.

== 4 April ==
List of shipwrecks: 4 April 1881
Ship	State	Description
Gosforth	United Kingdom	The steamship sprang a leak and foundered in the Bay of Biscay with the loss of two of her crew. Survivors took to a boat; they were rescued on 7 April by the barque Ariel (Norway). Gosforth was on a voyage from Bristol, Gloucestershire to Savona, Italy.
Pyrrha	United Kingdom	The steamship ran aground in the Dardanelles. She was on a voyage from Glasgow, Renfrewshire to Odesa, Russia. She was refloated and resumed her voyage.
Queen	United Kingdom	The ship sprang a leak and was abandoned in the Atlantic Ocean. Her crew were rescued by the steamship Orator (United Kingdom). Queen was on a voyage from Pensacola, Florida, United States to London. She was discovered in mid-June in a derelict condition and was taken in to for Queenstown, County Cork.

== 5 April ==
List of shipwrecks: 5 April 1881
Ship	State	Description
Easington	United Kingdom	The steamship ran aground at Galle, Ceylon. She was on a voyage from Galle to Akyab, Burma. She was refloated and put back to Galle in a leaky condition.

== 6 April ==
List of shipwrecks: 6 April 1881
Ship	State	Description
Cornish Girl	United Kingdom	The ship was abandoned at in the Atlantic Ocean. Her crew were rescued by Michelle Selchau (Denmark). Cornish Girl was on a voyage from Aracaju, Brazil to Falmouth, Cornwall.

== 7 April ==
List of shipwrecks: 7 April 1881
Ship	State	Description
Schiedam	Netherlands	The steamship was driven ashore at Oude-Tonge, South Holland. She was on a voyage from New York, United States to Rotterdam, South Holland.

== 9 April ==
List of shipwrecks: 9 April 1881
Ship	State	Description
Cæsar	Sweden	The ship ran aground on Hammond's Knowl, in the North Sea off the coast of Norfolk, United Kingdom. She was on a voyage from Turku, Grand Duchy of Finland to Algoa Bay. She was refloated and put in to Harwich, Essex, United Kingdom in a leaky condition and was beached there.
Newton	United Kingdom	The cargo ship was wrecked in the Atlantic Ocean off Madeira. She was on a voyage from Bahia, Brazil, to London.

== 11 April ==
List of shipwrecks: 11 April 1881
Ship	State	Description
John White	United Kingdom	The brigantine ran aground on the Rhyde Sands. She was on a voyage from South Shields, County Durham to Caen, Calvados, France.
Anne Milbank	New Zealand	The steamship was wrecked on the coast of New Zealand. on a rock in Parua Bay, but had been repaired by July

== 12 April ==
List of shipwrecks: 12 April 1881
Ship	State	Description
Agra	United Kingdom	The barque ran aground at Hubberston, Pembrokeshire and became hogged.
Alexander	United States	The ship foundered in the Bristol Channe 60 nautical miles (110 km) off Lundy Island, Devon, United Kingdom. Her crew were rescued. She was on a voyage from Cardiff, Glamorgan, United Kingdom to Rio de Janeiro, Brazil.
Daisy	United States	The steamship suffered a machinery failure and capsized. Two crewmen were killed.
General Havelock	United Kingdom	The tug was run into by the paddle steamer Shamrock (United Kingdom) and sank in the River Liffey. Her crew survived. She was later refloated and beached at Ringsend, County Dublin.
Marmora	Denmark	The barque was wrecked on the Scarweather Sands in the Bristol Channel. Her eight crew were rescued by the Porthcawl Lifeboat Chafyn Grove ( Royal National Lifeboat Institution). Marmora was on a voyage from Rochefort, Charente-Inférieure, France to Porthcawl, Glamorgan, United Kingdom.
Seine No. 3	France	The tug collided with another vessel and sank at Havre de Grâce, Seine-Inférieure. Her crew were rescued.
Unnamed	Flag unknown	The schooner was driven ashore and wrecked between "Pubeen Harbour" and "Glackhall Head", County Cork, United Kingdom.

== 14 April ==
List of shipwrecks: 14 April 1881
Ship	State	Description
Alpha	United Kingdom	The ship heeled over and filled in the River Usk. She was on a voyage from Maryport, Cumberland to Newport, Monmouthshire.
Scotland	United Kingdom	The ship departed from Geelong, Victoria for a British port. No further trace, reported missing.
Yeddo	United Kingdom	The steamship ran aground on the Longsand, in the North Sea off the coast of Essex. She was on a voyage from Hull, Yorkshire to Boston, Massachusetts, United States. She was refloated with the assistance of two tugs and towed in to Gravesend, Kent.

== 15 April ==
List of shipwrecks: 15 April 1881
Ship	State	Description
Belsize	United Kingdom	The steamship foundered in the Atlantic Ocean. Her crew were rescued by the barque Inga (Norway). Belsize was on a voyage from New Orleans, Louisiana, United States to Copenhagen, Denmark.
Carl Konow	Norway	The barque was run into by the steamship Chilian (United Kingdom) and sank 10 to 15 nautical miles (19 to 28 km) east of the Tuskar Rock. Her crew were rescued by Chilian. Carl Konow was on a voyage from Philadelphia, Pennsylvania, United States to Newry, County Antrim, United Kingdom.
Cheshire Lass	United Kingdom	The ship was run down and sunk in the Irish Sea.
Estrella	United Kingdom	The ship ran aground in Fleetwood Bay. She was on a voyage from Cartagena, Spain to Fleetwood, Lancashire. She was refloated but consequently sank. She was again refloated and taken in to Fleetwood.
Kestrel	United Kingdom	The steamship ran aground on Burhou, Channel Islands. All on board were rescued. She was on a voyage from London to Bordeaux, Gironde, France. She was refloated and taken in to Alderney, Channel Islands in a severely leaky condition.

== 17 April ==
List of shipwrecks: 17 April 1881
Ship	State	Description
Amazoneuse	United Kingdom	The steamship was driven ashore and wrecked near St. David's Head, Pembrokeshire, United Kingdom with the loss of a crew member. She was on a voyage from Liverpool, Lancashire, United Kingdom to Havre de Grâce, Seine-Inférieure and Pará, Brazil.
Annie	United Kingdom	The schooner struck a rock while on a course between Land's End and the Longships, Cornwall. She began to take on water and was taken in tow for Mount's Bay by the steamship Mary Monica (United Kingdom). After two hours the crew went on the steamship and after another hour of tow Annie sank.
Cotherstone, Emerald Isle, and Iron Ring	United Kingdom	The steamships Cotherstone and Emerald Isle collided in the River Mersey and were both severely damaged. Cotherstone was on a voyage from Liverpool, Lancashire to Bombay, India. Emerald Isle was on a voyage from Dundalk, County Louth to Liverpool. She was taken in to Liverpool in a sinking condition. The tug Iron Ring was severely damaged whilst rendering assistance to Emerald Isle.
Emily	United Kingdom	The brig collided with the steamship Wear (United Kingdom) and sank in the North Sea 14 nautical miles (26 km) north east of Whitby, Yorkshire. Her crew were rescued. Emily was on a voyage from West Hartlepool, County Durham to Torquay, Devon.
Katie	United Kingdom	The schooner struck the Runnel Stone in the English Channel off Gwennap Head, Cornwall, and sank. Her five crew were rescued by Mary Menica (United Kingdom). Katie was on a voyage from Norwich, Norfolk to Dublin.

== 18 April ==
List of shipwrecks: 18 April 1881
Ship	State	Description
Johanne	Denmark	The schooner ran aground at Safi, Morocco. Her crew were rescued. She was condemned and sold. Johanne had been refloated by early June and taken in to Safi.
John and Henry	United Kingdom	The schooner was driven ashore and wrecked "at Bullock". Her crew survived. She was on a voyage from Swansea, Glamorgan to Red Bay, County Antrim.

== 19 April ==
List of shipwrecks: 19 April 1881
Ship	State	Description
Shamrock	United Kingdom	The smack was driven ashore at Theddlethorpe, Lincolnshire. Her crew were rescued by the Theddlethorpe Lifeboat.
Zeemeeuw	Denmark	The schooner ran aground on the Middelgrunden, in the Baltic Sea. She was on a voyage from Tayport, Fife, United Kingdom to Memel, Germany. She was refloated with assistance and taken in to Copenhagen for repairs.

== 20 April ==
List of shipwrecks: 20 April 1881
Ship	State	Description
Album	Italy	The barque was driven ashore at Cortelazzo. Her crew were rescued. She was on a voyage from Cardiff, Glamorgan, United Kingdom to Venice.
Ark	United Kingdom	The barge caught fire and sank in the South West India Docks, London.

== 21 April ==
List of shipwrecks: 21 April 1881
Ship	State	Description
British King	United Kingdom	The tug struck rocks in Ramsey Sound and sank. Her crew were rescued.
Ellen Vair	United Kingdom	The ship collided with Gertrude (Flag unknown) off The Lizard, Cornwall and was abandoned.
Mizpah	United Kingdom	The steamship ran aground on Skagen, Denmark and broke her back. Nine or eleven of her 21 crew were reported to have been lost.
Zeus	United Kingdom	The steamship ran aground at Sunderland, County Durham. She was on a voyage from Antwerp, Belgium to Sunderland.

== 22 April ==
List of shipwrecks: 22 April 1881
Ship	State	Description
Wynyard Park	United Kingdom	The steamship collided with a lock and sank at Sunderland, County Durham. She was on a voyage from London to Sunderland.

== 23 April ==
List of shipwrecks: 23 April 1881
Ship	State	Description
Alsvid	Norway	The barque was wrecked at Saint Thomas, Virgin Islands. She was on a voyage from Newport, Monmouthshire, United Kingdom to Galveston, Texas, United States.
Helios	Sweden	The brig caught fire in the Atlantic Ocean and was abandoned. Her crew were rescued by Nelson (United Kingdom). Helios was on a voyage from Jamaica to Falmouth, Cornwall, United Kingdom.

== 24 April ==
List of shipwrecks: 24 April 1881
Ship	State	Description
Mary	United Kingdom	The ship was driven ashore at Brancaster, Norfolk. She was refloated with assistance.

== 25 April ==
List of shipwrecks: 25 April 1881
Ship	State	Description
City of Sanford	United States	The steamship was destroyed by fire in the St. Johns River. Four people were burnt to death and five were drowned.
Princess Alice	United Kingdom	The barque was wrecked on the Hartwell Reef with the loss of all but two of her crew. She was on a voyage from Cardiff, Glamorgan to Bahia, Brazil.

== 26 April ==
List of shipwrecks: 26 April 1881
Ship	State	Description
Christofora	Italy	The barque was destroyed by fire at Iquique, Chile.
HMS Doterel	Royal Navy	The Doterel-class sloop sank while at anchor one-half nautical mile (0.93 km) off Sandy Point, Chile, following an explosion and the loss of 143 lives. There were twelve survivors.

== 27 April ==
List of shipwrecks: 27 April 1881
Ship	State	Description
Cavalier	United Kingdom	The schooner was driven ashore at Lossiemouth, Moray. She was refloated on 29 April and taken in to Lossiemouth for repairs.
Corneille David	Flag unknown	The ship departed from Talcahuano for a European port. No further trace, reported overdue.
Michael Angelo	United Kingdom	The ship was sighted in the Pacific Ocean whilst on a voyage from Newcastle upon Tyne, Northumberland for Valparaíso, Chile. No further trace, reported missing..
Saint George	United States	The schooner struck an uncharted rock off Twin Rocks, Department of Alaska (57°50′05″N 152°18′45″W) and became waterlogged. The schooner Pauline Collins (United States) towed her to Long Island in the Alexander Archipelago in Southeast Alaska, but she was so badly damaged that she was declared nearly a total loss. Saint George was on a voyage from Kodiak to English Bay and Nutchick in the Department of Alaska.

== 28 April ==
List of shipwrecks: 28 April 1881
Ship	State	Description
Osprey	United Kingdom	The vessel was lost south of Douglas Bay, Isle of Man.
Water Lily	United Kingdom	The ship was run down and sunk 12 nautical miles (22 km) north of Ilfracombe, Devon by the barque Limbe (France). Her crew were rescued. Water Lily was on a voyage from Cardiff, Glamorgan to Waterford.

== 29 April ==
List of shipwrecks: 29 April 1881
Ship	State	Description
Tararua	United Kingdom	Tararua The steamboat struck the reef off Waipapa Point in the Catlins, New Zealand. She sank the next day with the loss of 131 of the 151 people on board. This is the worst civilian shipping disaster in New Zealand.
Waterlily	United Kingdom	The brigantine collided with a tug and sank at Cardiff, Glamorgan.

== 30 April ==
List of shipwrecks: 30 April 1881
Ship	State	Description
Blue Bell	United Kingdom	The fishing lugger sprang a leak and foundered off the Leman Sand, in the North Sea. Her crew were rescued.
Neptune	United Kingdom	The trow capsized and sank in the River Parrett at Bridgwater, Somerset. All on board survived.

== Unknown date ==
List of shipwrecks: Unknown date in April 1881
Ship	State	Description
Admiral	United Kingdom	The ship was driven ashore in Aberlady Bay.
Æthelred	United Kingdom	The barque collided with another vessel and sank in the Pacific Ocean before 18 April. All on board were rescued. She was on a voyage from Liverpool, Lancashire to San Francisco, California, United States.
Alfred	United Kingdom	The smack was holed by her anchor. She was on a voyage from Cowes to St. Helen's, Isle of Wight. She was towed in to Cowes in a waterlogged condition by a tug.
Alfred Rooker	United Kingdom	The smack was driven ashore in Dundrum Bay. She was on a voyage from Bristol, Gloucestershire to Dublin.
Amelie	France	The chasse-marée collided with the steamship Patrie (France) and sank in the Verdun Roads.
Amity	United Kingdom	The ship was wrecked on Little Inagua, Bahamas. She was on a voyage from Liverpool to Pensacola, Florida, United States.
Andrea Mignano	Italy	The brig struck a sunken rock. She was beached at Mayagüez, Puerto Rico.
Ann	United Kingdom	The ship ran aground and sank at Burghhead, Lothian.
Anne Marie	France	The barque was driven ashore and wrecked at Cape Gatt, Spain. Her crew were rescued.
Ballogie	United Kingdom	The steamship was driven ashore at Höganäs, Sweden. She was on a voyage from Burntisland, Fife to Danzig, Germany.
Beagle	United Kingdom	The ship was driven ashore at "Castle-hill".
Boa Fe	Brazil	The ship was driven ashore at Bahia before 12 April. She was on a voyage from Lagos, Lagos Colony to Bahia.
Carrie S. Dagle	United States	The fishing schooner was last seen on 13 April with a bad leak, either two days after, or two days before, a bad storm swept the Western Banks. Lost with all twelve crew.
Catherine	United Kingdom	The smack collided with Georgette (United Kingdom) at Grimsby, Lincolnshire and was severely damaged. Her crew were taken off by Georgette. Catherine was beached in a waterlogged condition.
Celerity	United Kingdom	The schooner ran aground and sank on the East Barrow Sand, in the North Sea off the coast of Essex.
Ceto	United Kingdom	The ship ran aground at Bermuda. She was refloated.
Champion	United Kingdom	The barque collided with Armenia (United States) and was severely damaged. She put in to New Orleans, Louisiana, United States.
Christina	United Kingdom	The brig ran aground on the Middle Cross Sand, in the North Sea off the coast of Norfolk. She was on a voyage from Grimsby, Lincolnshire to Barcelona, Spain. She was refloated and assisted in to Great Yarmouth, Norfolk in a leaky condition.
Chrysolite	United Kingdom	The steamship was driven ashore at Veracruz, Mexico.
Derwent	United Kingdom	The ship sank in the River Wear.
Eagle	Austria-Hungary	The barque was wrecked at Boa Vista, Cape Verde Islands with the loss of her captain. She was on a voyage from South Shields, County Durham, United Kingdom to Buenos Aires, Argentina.
Echo	United Kingdom	The barque was driven ashore in Chichester Harbour, Sussex.
Eliezer	Norway	The barque was driven ashore at Helsingborg, Sweden. She was on a voyage from Liverpool to Memel, Germany.
Ellen Widdup	United Kingdom	The ship ran aground at Islandmagee, County Antrim. She was on a voyage from Larne, County Antrim to the River Duddon.
Faith	United Kingdom	The brig was driven ashore at the mouth of the Morlaix. She was on avoyate from Newcastle upon Tyne, Northumberland to Morlaix, Finistère, France.
James Harris	United Kingdom	The steamship collided with Andalusia (flag unknown) and sank in the North Sea, off the Farne Islands, Northumberland with the loss of fourteen of her eighteen crew.
Johannes	Germany	The brigantine was wrecked at Cap-Haïtien, Haiti.
Josephine	United Kingdom	The barque was driven ashore and wrecked at Cienfuegos, Cuba. She was on a voyage from Baltimore, Maryland, United States to Cienfuegos.
L. B. Wing	United States	The schooner foundered in the Atlantic Ocean with the loss of all but two of her crew. Survivors were rescued by the barque Mary Nelson (United Kingdom).
Lom	Norway	The barque was driven ashore at Minatitlán, Mexico.
Major	France	The brig was driven ashore and wrecked at Cape Gatt. Her crew were rescued.
Maria Ana	United Kingdom	The barque was driven ashore and wrecked at Almería, Spain.
Mary	United Kingdom	The brig was run down and sunk in the English Channel off the South Foreland, Kent by the steamship Rowlands (United Kingdom). Her crew were rescued by Rowlands. Mary was on a voyage from Newcastle upon Tyne to Dover, Kent.
Mary D. Bryan	United Kingdom	The schooner was abandoned in the Atlantic Ocean before 13 April.
Mathian Fourny	France	The schooner ran aground at Le Hourdel, Somme and became hogged. She was on a voyage from Cette, Hérault to Abbeville, Somme.
Medora	United Kingdom	The ship ran aground in the River Usk.
Phœbe Lewis	United Kingdom	The ship was abandoned in the Atlantic Ocean 60 nautical miles (110 km) off Ouessant, Finistère, France. She was on a voyage from Newport, Monmouthshire to Gijón, Spain.
Pride of Wales	United Kingdom	The ship caught fire in the Atlantic Ocean and was abandoned by her crew. She was on a voyage from Santos, Brazil to Pensacola.
Raieteur	United Kingdom	The steamship was driven ashore at St John's Point, Jamaica. She was on a voyage from Belize City, British Guiana to Jamaica.
Ruby	United Kingdom	The barque was abandoned in the Atlantic Ocean. Her crew were rescued by Chittagong (United Kingdom).
Santiago de Cuba	United States	The steamship ran aground at Charleston, South Carolina. She was on a voyage from Charleston to New York. She was refloated and put back to Charleston in a leaky condition.
Snaefell	(United Kingdom of Great Britain and Ireland) Isle of Man	The paddle steamer collided with Osprey (United Kingdom off Douglas Head.
Spread Eagle	United Kingdom	The smack was run into by the brigantine Johan Dahl (Flag unknown) and sank in the Bristol Channel off the coast of Glamorgan. Her crew were rescued. Spread Eagle was on a voyage from Fishguard, Pembrokeshire to Newport, Monmouthshire.
Tevere	Austria-Hungary	The barque caught fire at Pascagoula, Mississippi, United States.
Thurland Castle	United Kingdom	The ship was driven ashore in the Columbia River. She was refloated.
Transit	United Kingdom	The ship was driven ashore in the Cranberry Inlet.
