= TSS Rosstrevor =

History
- Name: 1895–1926: TSS Rosstrevor
- Owner: 1895–1923: London and North Western Railway; 1923–1926: London, Midland and Scottish Railway
- Operator: 1895–1923: London and North Western Railway; 1923–1926: London, Midland and Scottish Railway
- Port of registry: (United Kingdom)
- Route: 1895–1908: Holyhead – Greenore; 1908–1926: Holyhead – Dublin
- Builder: William Denny and Brothers
- Yard number: 503
- Launched: 26 February 1895
- Out of service: 1926
- Fate: Scrapped 1926

General characteristics
- Tonnage: 1,065 gross register tons (GRT)
- Length: 272.1 ft (82.9 m)
- Beam: 35.1 ft (10.7 m)
- Draught: 14.2 ft (4.3 m)
- Speed: 18 knots

TSS Rosstrevor was a steam turbine passenger and cargo vessel operated by the London and North Western Railway from 1895 to 1923, and the London, Midland and Scottish Railway from 1923 to 1926.

== History ==
She was built by William Denny and Brothers for the London and North Western Railway in 1895 and put on the Holyhead – Greenore route in succession to paddle steamer Earl Spencer.

She was named after the townland in which the village of Rostrevor is located in County Down, Northern Ireland.

On 2 March 1896 she was grounded at Carlingford Lough. She was refloated on 7 March, repaired and returned to service.

In 1908, the TSS Rathmore replaced her on this route. Her first class accommodation was removed and she was transferred to the Holyhead – Dublin service.

She was scrapped in 1926.
