= PS Greenore =

English passenger vessel

History
- Name: 1896–1912: PS Greenore; 1912–1922: PS Cloghmore; 1922–1928: PS Ribble Queen
- Owner: 1896–1922: London and North Western Railway; 1922–1928: Ribble Passenger Transport Company
- Operator: 1896–1922: London and North Western Railway; 1922–1928: Ribble Passenger Transport Company
- Port of registry: (United Kingdom)
- Route: 1896–1922: Passenger services on Carlingford Lough
- Builder: J.P. Rennoldson
- Launched: 28 July 1896
- Out of service: 1928
- Fate: Broken up 1928

General characteristics
- Tonnage: 213 gross register tons (GRT)
- Length: 109 ft (33 m)
- Beam: 22.1 ft (6.7 m)
- Draught: 8.1 ft (2.5 m)

PS Greenore was a paddle steamer passenger vessel operated by the London and North Western Railway from 1896 to 1922.

== History ==
She was built by J.P. Rennoldson for the London and North Western Railway in 1894. She was the smallest and the last paddle steamer operated by the company. She was used for passenger services on Carlingford Lough.

She was renamed PS Cloughmore when a new Greenore was ordered in 1912.

She was sold in April 1922 to the Ribble Passenger Transport Company Ltd who renamed her Ribble Queen. She was put to work on excursion services from Preston to Southport and Liverpool, but these were not successful and they finished in 1925, and she was broken up in 1928.

Paddle Steamer Greenore at Warrenpoint
