= PS Eleanor (1873) =

History
- Name: 1873–1881: PS Eleanor
- Namesake: Possibly Eleanor Moon
- Owner: 1873–1881: London and North Western Railway
- Operator: 1873–1881: London and North Western Railway
- Port of registry: (United Kingdom)
- Route: 1873–1881: Holyhead - Greenore
- Builder: Robert Stephenson and Company
- Launched: 28 May 1873
- Out of service: 1881
- Fate: Stranded 27 January 1881

General characteristics
- Tonnage: 917 gross register tons (GRT)
- Length: 252.9 ft (77.1 m)
- Beam: 30 ft (9.1 m)
- Draught: 15.7 ft (4.8 m)

PS Eleanor was a paddle steamer cargo vessel operated by the London and North Western Railway from 1873 to 1881.

== History ==
She was built by Robert Stephenson and Company for the London and North Western Railway in 1873. She may have been named after Eleanor Moon (1847–1859), the eldest daughter of the company's then chairman, Richard Moon, and was built specifically for the Greenore route that Moon had championed.

She ran aground on 27 January 1881 at Leestone Point, Kilkeel, Ireland during a dense fog. The railway attempted to salvage her but severe gales in the following weeks completed her destruction. Within the year, the railway company had replaced her with a new paddle steamer of the same name, Eleanor.
