= PS Duke of Sutherland =

History
- Name: 1868–1886: PS Duke of Sutherland
- Owner: 1868–1886: London and North Western Railway
- Operator: 1868–1886: London and North Western Railway
- Port of registry: (United Kingdom of Great Britain and Ireland) London
- Route: 1868–1886: Holyhead – Greenore
- Builder: A. Leslie and Company
- Yard number: 96
- Launched: 26 March 1868
- Completed: May 1868
- In service: 29 May 1868
- Out of service: 1886
- Identification: United Kingdom Official Number 58402
- Fate: Scrapped

General characteristics
- Tonnage: 860 gross register tons (GRT)
- Length: 244 ft 0 in (74.37 m)
- Beam: 30 ft 1 in (9.17 m)
- Draught: 14 ft 3 in (4.34 m)
- Installed power: 2-cylinder oscillating steam engine, 270 nhp
- Propulsion: Paddle wheels
- Speed: 15 knots (28 km/h)
- Capacity: 90 passengers

PS Duke of Sutherland was a paddle steamer cargo vessel operated by the London and North Western Railway from 1868 to 1886.

== Description ==
Duke of Sutherland was 244 feet 0 inches (74.37 m) long, with a beam of 30 feet 1 inch (9.17 m) and a draught of 14 feet 3 inches (4.34 m). She was assessed at 860 GRT. She was powered by a 2-cylinder oscillating steam engine which had cylinders of 63 inches (160 cm) diameter by 66 inches (170 cm) stroke. Built by R. Stephenson & Co., Newcastle upon Tyne, Northumberland, the engine was rated at 270 nhp. It drove two paddle wheels and could propel the ship at 15 knots (28 km/h). Accommodation was provided for 90 passengers.

== History ==
Duke of Sutherland was built as yard number 96 by A. Leslie and Company, Hebburn on Tyne, Northumberland for the London and North Western Railway. She was launched on 26 March 1868 and completed in May. The United Kingdom Official Number 58402 was allocated and her port of registry was London. She may have been named for the third Duke of Sutherland, who had been a director of the railway (under his courtesy title of Marquess of Stafford). On 20 February 1877, she collided with Stanley and was driven ashore at Holyhead, Anglesey. All on board were rescued. She was on a voyage from Dublin to Holyhead. She was withdrawn from service in 1888 and sold for breaking.
