= PS Eleanor (1881) =

History
- Name: 1881–1902: PS Eleanor
- Owner: 1881–1902: London and North Western Railway
- Operator: 1881–1902: London and North Western Railway
- Port of registry: (United Kingdom)
- Route: 1880–1902: Holyhead - Greenore
- Builder: Cammell Laird
- Yard number: 500
- Launched: 23 November 1881
- Out of service: July 1902
- Fate: Broken up 1902

General characteristics
- Tonnage: 854 gross register tons (GRT)
- Length: 254.2 ft (77.5 m)
- Beam: 30 ft (9.1 m)
- Draught: 14.2 ft (4.3 m)

PS Eleanor was a paddle steamer cargo vessel operated by the London and North Western Railway from 1881 to 1902.

== History ==
She was built by Cammell Laird for the London and North Western Railway in 1881. She was very similar in specification to the paddle steamer Isabella of 1877.

She was put on the Holyhead–Greenore route to replace her namesake Eleanor which had been wrecked earlier in the same year.
