= PS Royal Consort =

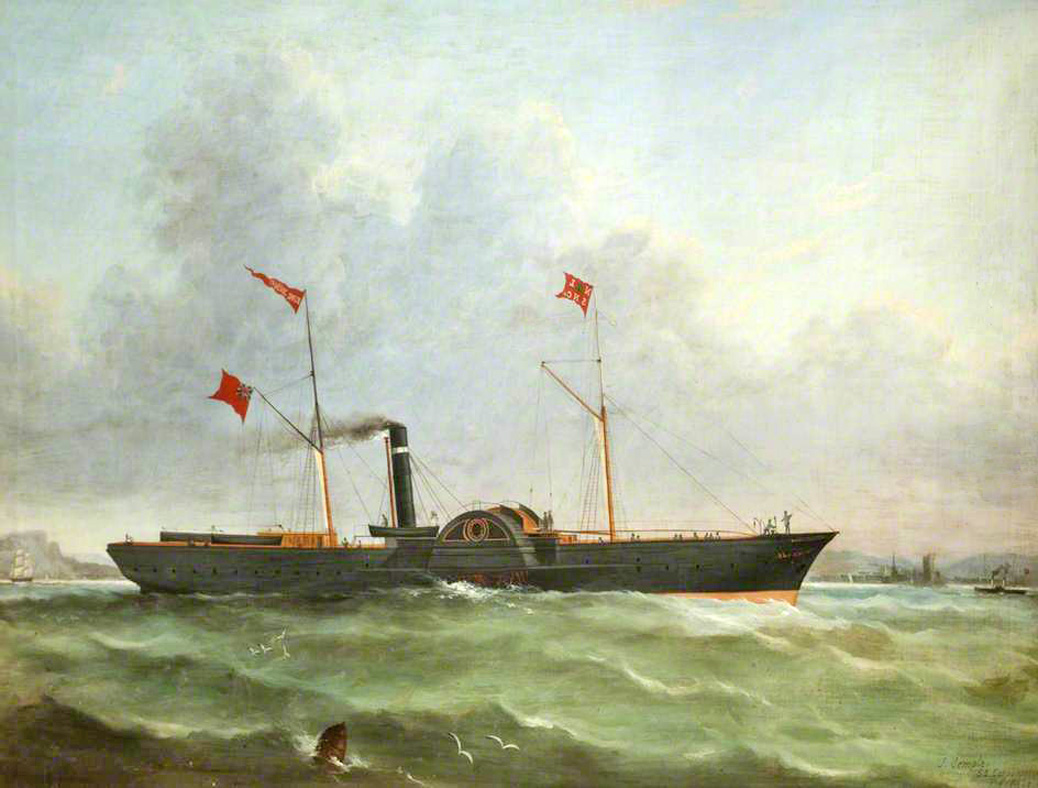
- Royal Consort

History
- Name: Royal Consort
- Owner: F. Kemp and Company, Fleetwood (1844–70); Lancashire and Yorkshire Railway (1870–80); Lancashire and Yorkshire Railway and London and North Western Railway (1880–90; A. & B. Stewart, Birkenhead (1890–91)
- Operator: 1844–1870: North Lancashire Steam Navigation Company; 1870–1880: Lancashire and Yorkshire Railway; Lancashire and Yorkshire Railway and London and North Western Railway (1880–90); A. & B. Stewart, Birkenhead (1890–93)
- Port of registry: Glasgow, United Kingdom (1844–50); Fleetwood, United Kingdom (1850–91)
- Route: 1870–1890: Belfast – Fleetwood
- Builder: Tod & McGregor, Glasgow
- Yard number: 9
- Launched: 2 August 1844
- Out of service: 1891
- Identification: United Kingdom Official Number 17252

General characteristics
- Tonnage: 522 gross register tons (GRT), 297 NRT (1844–66); 795 gross register tons (GRT), 394 NRT (1866–91)
- Length: 177.9 ft (54.22 m) (1844–66); 215.5 feet (65.68 m) (1866–91)
- Beam: 25.2 ft (7.68 m); 29.2 feet (8.90 m) (1866–91)
- Depth: 15.2 ft (4.63 m); 16.0 feet (4.88 m) (1866–91)

PS Royal Consort was a paddle steamship passenger vessel operated by the London and North Western Railway and the Lancashire and Yorkshire Railway from 1870 to 1890.

== Description ==
As built, the ship was 177.9 feet (54.22 m), with a beam of 25.2 feet (7.68 m) and a depth of 15.2 feet (4.63 m). A two-cylinder double-acting steam engine propelled the ship via paddle wheels. The engine was built by Tod & McGregor, Glasgow. She was assessed at 522 GRT, 297 NRT.

== History ==
Royal Consort was built in 1844 by Tod & McGregor, Glasgow as yard number 9. She was launched on 2 August. She was originally owned by F. Kemp and Company and its subsidiary the North Lancashire Steam Navigation Company and was used on the Fleetwood to Ardrossan service. Her port of registry was Glasgow and the United Kingdom Official Number 17252 was allocated. On 18 March 1850 her port of registry was changed to Fleetwood. She also operated on the Glasgow to Derry service in 1851–52. On 14 December 1858, Royal Consort ran aground at Belfast, County Antrim whilst on a voyage from Fleetwood to Belfast. She was refloated.

In 1866, she was lengthened to 215.5 feet (65.68 m), with a beam of 29.2 feet (8.90 m) and a depth of 16.0 feet (4.88 m). At some point she was re-engined; the new engine was made by J. Jack & Co., Liverpool. She was assessed at 795 gross register tons (GRT), 394 NRT In 1870, Royal Consort was sold to the Lancashire and Yorkshire Railway. The London and North Western Railway became joint owners in 1880. She was sold to A. & B. Stewart, Birkenhead, Cheshire in 1890 and was deleted from the shipping registers in 1891.
