= TSS Slieve Bawn (1936) =

History
- Name: 1937–1967: TSS Slieve Bawn
- Owner: 1937–1948: London, Midland and Scottish Railway; 1948–1968: British Transport Commission; 1962–1972: British Rail
- Operator: 1937–1948: London, Midland and Scottish Railway; 1948–1968: British Transport Commission; 1962–1972: British Rail
- Port of registry: (United Kingdom)
- Route: 1937–1972: Holyhead – Dublin
- Builder: William Denny and Brothers, Dumbarton
- Yard number: 1299
- Launched: 15 December 1936
- Completed: 1937
- Out of service: 15 June 1972
- Fate: Scrapped at Gijon

General characteristics
- Tonnage: 1,573 gross register tons (GRT)
- Length: 309.6 ft (94.4 m)
- Beam: 47.4 ft (14.4 m)
- Draught: 13 ft (4.0 m)

TSS Slieve Bawn was a twin screw steamer cargo vessel operated by the London, Midland and Scottish Railway from 1935 to 1948, and the British Transport Commission from 1948 to 1962.

== History ==
She was built by William Denny and Brothers of Dumbarton, launched in 1936 and handed over to the London, Midland and Scottish Railway in 1937.

She was named after the mountain Slieve Bawn in Ireland

She replaced the Slieve Gallion of 1907.
