= TSS Slievemore =

History
- Name: 1904–1927: TSS Slievemore
- Owner: 1904–1923: London and North Western Railway; 1923–1932: London, Midland and Scottish Railway
- Operator: 1904–1923: London and North Western Railway; 1923–1932: London, Midland and Scottish Railway
- Port of registry: (United Kingdom)
- Route: 1904–1927: Holyhead - Dublin
- Builder: Harland and Wolff
- Yard number: 362
- Launched: 17 May 1904
- Completed: 17 October 1904
- Out of service: 1932
- Fate: Scrapped 1932

General characteristics
- Tonnage: 1,138 gross register tons (GRT)
- Length: 299.8 ft (91.4 m)
- Beam: 37.2 ft (11.3 m)
- Draught: 15.7 ft (4.8 m)

TSS Slievemore was a twin screw steamer passenger and cargo vessel operated by the London and North Western Railway from 1904 to 1923, and the London, Midland and Scottish Railway from 1923 to 1932.

== History ==
She was built by Harland and Wolff of Belfast for the London and North Western Railway in 1904.

She was named after Slievemore (Irish: Sliabh Mór), the highest peak on Achill Island, in County Mayo, Ireland. Its elevation is 671 metres.

Her Captain, Samuel David Pritchard, was awarded an MBE in 1920 in recognition of his services at sea during the First World War.

She was scrapped in 1932, and the London, Midland and Scottish Railway replaced her with a new vessel of the same name, Slieve More.
