= PS Duke of Connaught =

History
- Name: 1875–1895: P.S. Duke of Connaught
- Namesake: Prince Arthur, Duke of Connaught and Strathearn
- Owner: 1875–1894: Lancashire and Yorkshire Railway
- Operator: 1875–1894: Lancashire and Yorkshire Railway
- Port of registry: (United Kingdom)
- Route: 1875–1893: Belfast – Fleetwood
- Builder: Barrow-in-Furness
- Launched: 21 July 1875
- Out of service: 1893
- Fate: Scrapped October 1893

General characteristics
- Tonnage: 1,082 gross register tons (GRT)

PS Duke of Connaught was a paddle steamer passenger vessel operated by the London and North Western Railway and the Lancashire and Yorkshire Railway from 1875 to 1893.
