= PS Rose =

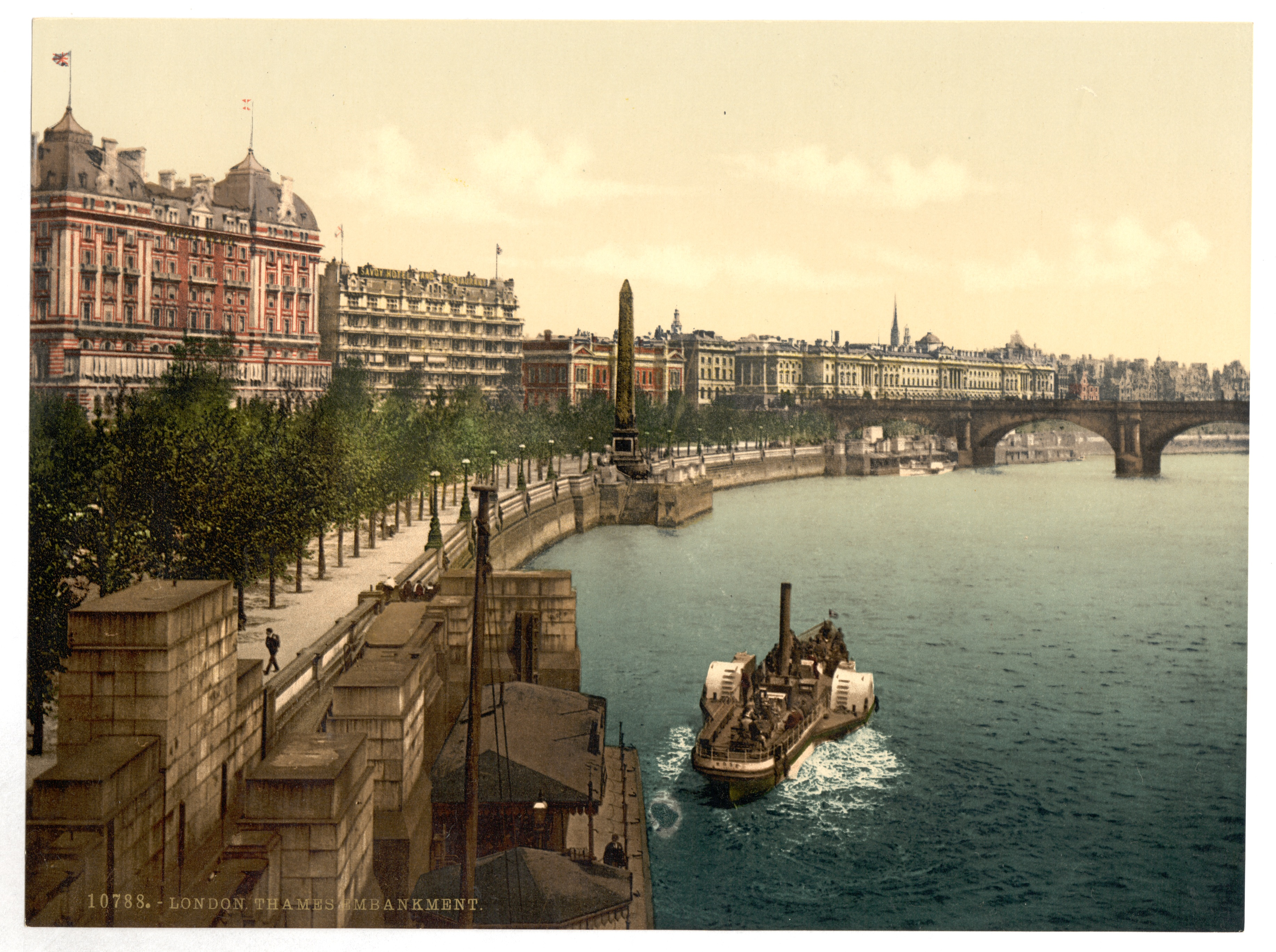
- PS Rose at the Thames Embankment

History
- Name: 1876–1894: PS Rose
- Owner: 1876–1894: London and North Western Railway
- Operator: 1876–1894: London and North Western Railway
- Port of registry: (United Kingdom)
- Route: 1876–1894: Holyhead - Greenore
- Builder: Cammell Laird
- Yard number: 430
- Launched: 1876
- Out of service: 1894

General characteristics
- Tonnage: 1,177 gross register tons (GRT)
- Length: 291.8 ft (88.9 m)
- Beam: 32.2 ft (9.8 m)
- Draught: 15.7 ft (4.8 m)

PS Rose was a paddle steamer passenger vessel operated by the London and North Western Railway from 1876 to 1894.

== History ==
She was built by Cammell Laird for the London and North Western Railway in 1876.
