= MV Cambria =

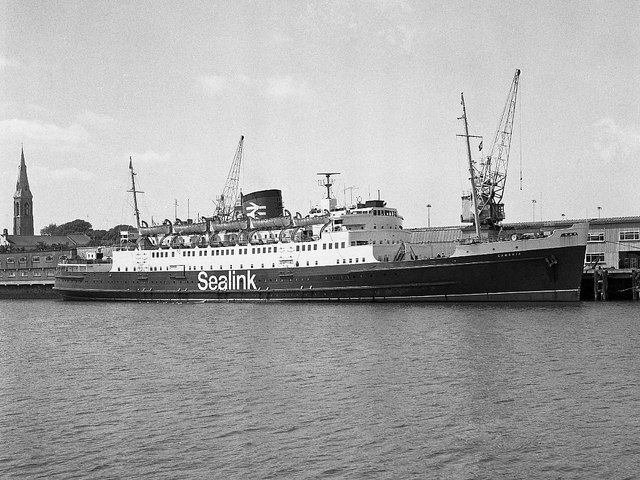
- Ferry Cambria at Carlisle Pier, June 1975

History
- Name: 1949–1976: MV Cambria; 1976–1980: Altaif; 1980–1981: Al Taif
- Owner: 1949–1968: British Transport Commission; 1962–1976: British Rail; 1976–1981: Orri Navigation Company
- Operator: 1949–1968: British Transport Commission; 1962–1976: British Rail; 1976–1981: Orri Navigation Company
- Port of registry: (United Kingdom)
- Route: 1949–1976: Holyhead – Dún Laoghaire; 1970–1972: Heysham – Dún Laoghaire
- Builder: Harland & Wolff, Belfast
- Yard number: 1368
- Launched: 21 September 1948
- Maiden voyage: 1949
- Identification: IMO number: 5059020
- Fate: Foundered 15 January 1985

General characteristics
- Tonnage: 4,972 gross register tons (GRT)
- Length: 379.5 ft (115.7 m)
- Beam: 54.2 ft (16.5 m)
- Draught: 27.5 ft (8.4 m)
- Speed: 15 knots

MV Cambria was a twin screw motor vessel operated by the British Transport Commission from 1948 to 1962 and British Rail from 1962 to 1976. Together with her sister ship the MV Hibernia she served the Holyhead to Dún Laoghaire route across the Irish Sea.

== History ==
She was built by Harland & Wolff of Belfast, launched in 1948 for the British Transport Commission and started service in 1949. She replaced a smaller 1920 vessel of the same name, the twin screw steamer Cambria, and despite a large size had a reduced maximum speed of 21 knots (39 km/h) compared to 25 knots (46 km/h) of the older ship. In 1951 she was fitted with Denny-Brown stabilisers. In 1964–65 they were refurbished with airline style seating. Some cabins and staterooms were removed and replaced with second-class lounges, and a cafeteria. The screened areas were extended to provide further covered seating, and the first and second class smokerooms were converted into a tea lounge.

She was sold in 1976 to the Orri Navigation Company in Saudi Arabia and became the Al Taif.
