= TSS Duke of Albany =

Passenger ship, later Royal Navy ship

History
- Name: HMS Duke of Albany
- Owner: 1907–1917: London and North Western Railway
- Operator: 1907–1914: London and North Western Railway; 1914–1917: Royal Navy
- Port of registry: (United Kingdom)
- Route: 1907–1914: Belfast – Fleetwood
- Builder: John Brown & Company
- Yard number: 376
- Launched: June 1907
- Out of service: 1916
- Fate: Torpedoed and sunk, 24 August 1916

General characteristics
- Tonnage: 2,180 GRT
- Length: 330.5 ft (100.7 m)
- Beam: 41.1 ft (12.5 m)
- Draught: 17.1 ft (5.2 m)
- Speed: 22.5 knots (41.7 km/h; 25.9 mph)

TSS Duke of Albany was a passenger vessel operated by the London and North Western Railway and the Lancashire and Yorkshire Railway from 1907 to 1914. and also as HMS Duke of Albany from 1914 to 1916.

== History ==
She was built by John Brown and Co. at Clydebank, Scotland, as part of a fleet of seven ships delivered by the company between 1892 and 1909. She operated on the Douglas-to-Heysham route as well as Liverpool-to-Belfast. She was also the vessel that carried one of the anchors for RMS Titanic to Belfast.

She was requisitioned by the Admiralty in 1914 for use by the Royal Navy during the First World War as an armed boarding steamer, serving as HMS Duke of Albany. She was torpedoed and sunk about 9:10 AM on 24 August 1916 by the Imperial German Navy submarine SM UB-27 in the North Sea approximately 20 miles (32 km) east of the Pentland Skerries at approximately 58°42′N 2°23′W. The subsequent Court of Inquiry into the sinking determined that some casualties were the result of her depth charges exploding as she sank, and recommended "When any vessel is in imminent danger of sinking all Depth Charges should be rendered inoperative by inserting the safety catch so as to prevent loss of life...due to the depth charges exploding after the vessel has sunk."

Her ship's bell was salvaged in 2008.
