= PS Princess of Wales (1869) =

Tyne-built paddle steamer (1869 - 1896)

History
- Name: Princess of Wales
- Owner: Lancashire and Yorkshire Railway
- Operator: Lancashire and Yorkshire Railway
- Port of registry: (United Kingdom)
- Route: Belfast – Fleetwood
- Builder: A. Leslie and Company, River Tyne
- Launched: 4 December 1869
- Out of service: 1896
- Fate: Scrapped 1896

General characteristics
- Tonnage: 946 gross register tons (GRT)
- Length: 260 ft (79 m)

PS Princess of Wales was a paddle steamer passenger vessel operated by the London and North Western Railway and the Lancashire and Yorkshire Railway from 1870 to 1896.

== History ==
She was built by A. Leslie and Company on the River Tyne as one of the first new ships commissioned by the London and North Western Railway and the Lancashire and Yorkshire Railway for their services from Fleetwood.
