= PS Prince of Wales (1886) =

History
- Name: 1886–1896: P.S. Prince of Wales
- Owner: 1886–1896: Lancashire and Yorkshire Railway
- Operator: 1886–1896: Lancashire and Yorkshire Railway
- Port of registry: (United Kingdom)
- Route: 1886–1896: Belfast – Fleetwood
- Builder: Barrow-in-Furness
- Launched: 20 February 1886
- Fate: Sold 1896, sunk 1907

General characteristics
- Tonnage: 1,429 gross register tons (GRT)

PS Prince of Wales was a paddle steamer passenger vessel operated by the London and North Western Railway and the Lancashire and Yorkshire Railway from 1886 to 1896.

== History ==
She was deployed on the Fleetwood to Belfast services. She was the last paddle steamer built by the railway companies for cross channel traffic.

In 1896 she was sold and moved to Spain.
