= TSS Galtee More =

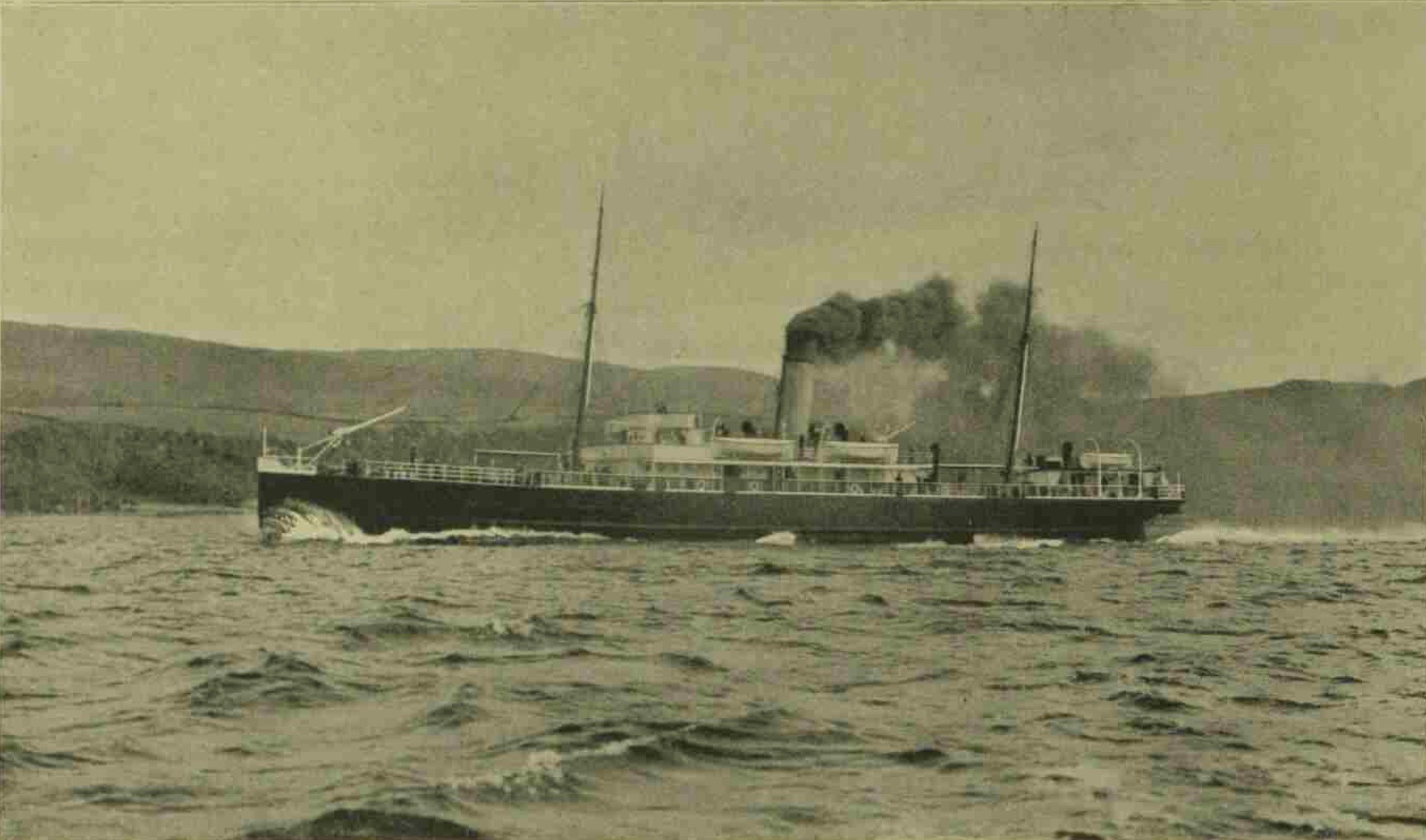
- TSS Galtee More from the Illustrated London News, 20 August 1898

History
- Name: 1898–1925: TSS Galtee More
- Owner: 1898–1923: London and North Western Railway; 1923–1925: London, Midland and Scottish Railway
- Operator: 1898–1925: London and North Western Railway; 1923–1925: London, Midland and Scottish Railway
- Port of registry: (United Kingdom)
- Route: 1898–1925: Holyhead – Greenore
- Builder: William Denny and Brothers, Dumbarton
- Yard number: 592
- Launched: 24 May 1898
- Fate: Scrapped 7 September 1925

General characteristics
- Tonnage: 1,112 gross register tons (GRT)
- Length: 276.1 ft (84.2 m)
- Beam: 35.1 ft (10.7 m)
- Speed: 18.6 knots (34.4 km/h)

TSS Galtee More was a twin screw passenger steamship operated by the London and North Western Railway from 1898 to 1923.

== History ==
She was built by William Denny and Brothers of Dumbarton for the London and North Western Railway in 1898. She was named after Galtymore, the highest of the Galtee Mountains in Ireland. She was put in service between Holyhead and Greenore.

On 17 September 1909 she was approaching Carlingford Lough when, in dense fog and at low tide, she went aground near Houlbowline light. The company’s lough steamer, Greenore, was promptly in attendance and the Galtee More shortly afterwards floated off.
