= USS Cygnus (AF-23) =

Cargo ship of the United States Navy

History

United States
- Builder: Cammell Laird, Birkenhead
- Launched: 22 March 1924 as SS La Perla
- Acquired: 12 August 1942
- Commissioned: 11 August 1942
- Decommissioned: 18 July 1946
- Stricken: date unknown
- Fate: Transferred to the Maritime Commission, 18 July 1946

General characteristics
- Displacement: 7,171 t.(fl)
- Length: 336 ft 3 in (102.49 m)
- Beam: 48 ft (15 m)
- Draught: 23 ft 8 in (7.21 m)
- Propulsion: Reciprocating engine, single screw, 1,975 shp
- Speed: 13.2 knots (24 km/h) maximum
- Complement: 112
- Armament: two single 3 in (76 mm) dual purpose gun mounts, two single 20 mm guns gun mounts

USS Cygnus (AF-23) was a Cygnus-class cargo ship acquired by the U.S. Navy for service in World War II, named after the constellation Cygnus. She was responsible for delivering necessary goods and equipment to ships and stations in the war zone.

Cygnus (AF-23) was built as SS La Perla in 1925 by Cammell Laird, Birkenhead, England; acquired by the Navy 12 August 1942; and commissioned 11 August 1942.

== World War II Pacific Theatre operations ==
After sailing in convoy to Pearl Harbor and back between 4 September and 24 September 1942, Cygnus cleared San Francisco, California, 10 October and arrived in Auckland, New Zealand, 3 November. Until 5 January 1944 she operated on a regular run carrying chilled meats and vegetables from Auckland to the American bases at Tongatapu, Tonga Islands; Pago Pago, American Samoa; Bora Bora, Society Islands; Cook Islands; and Funafuti, Ellice Islands. Between 18 January 1944 and 9 September 1945 she sailed on similar duty from Auckland and Napier, New Zealand, to Espiritu Santo and Efate, New Hebrides, the Solomon Islands; and Nouméa, New Caledonia.

== End-of-war activity ==
After a west coast overhaul, Cygnus sailed via Pearl Harbor to discharge cargo at Okinawa in December 1945. Arriving at Manus, Admiralty Islands, 3 January 1946, she operated out of this port on cargo duty to Nouméa, Espiritu Santo, and American Samoa until 13 March when she returned to the U.S. West Coast and then sailed for New York, arriving 2 July.

== Post-war decommissioning ==
Cygnus was decommissioned 18 July 1946 and transferred to the War Shipping Administration for disposal the same day.
