= TSS Slieve Bloom (1930) =

History
- Name: 1930–1965: TSS Slieve Bloom
- Owner: 1930–1948: London, Midland and Scottish Railway; 1948–1965: British Transport Commission
- Operator: 1930–1948: London, Midland and Scottish Railway; 1948–1965: British Transport Commission
- Port of registry: (United Kingdom)
- Route: 1930–1965: Heysham – Belfast and Holyhead – Dublin
- Builder: William Denny and Brothers, Dumbarton
- Yard number: 1249
- Launched: 24 October 1930
- Out of service: 7 October 1965
- Fate: Scrapped 1965

General characteristics
- Tonnage: 1,297 gross register tons (GRT)
- Length: 310 ft (94 m)
- Beam: 44.6 ft (13.6 m)
- Draught: 15.4 ft (4.7 m)
- Speed: 16 knots

TSS Slieve Bloom was a twin screw steamer cargo vessel operated by the London, Midland and Scottish Railway from 1930 to 1948, and the British Transport Commission from 1948 to 1965.

== History ==
She was built by William Denny and Brothers of Dumbarton and launched in 1930. She had capacity for around 640 head of cattle. She was equipped with electrically operated cranes and Brown hydro-electric steering.
