= TSS North Wall =

Twin screw steamer cargo vessel

History
- Name: 1883–1904: TSS North Wall
- Owner: 1883–1904: London and North Western Railway
- Operator: 1883–1904: London and North Western Railway
- Port of registry: (United Kingdom)
- Route: 1883–1904: Holyhead – Dublin
- Builder: Robert Duncan and Co, Port Glasgow
- Yard number: 188
- Launched: 31 August 1883
- Out of service: December 1904
- Fate: Scrapped 1904

General characteristics
- Tonnage: 931 gross register tons (GRT)
- Length: 300.2 ft (91.5 m)
- Beam: 33.1 ft (10.1 m)

TSS North Wall was a twin screw steamer cargo vessel operated by the London and North Western Railway (LNWR) from 1883 to 1904.

== History ==
She was built by Robert Duncan and Company of Port Glasgow for the London and North Western Railway in 1883 as a cargo vessel. She is notable as the first screw propulsion vessel acquired by the London and North Western Railway. She operated on the Holyhead, Wales to Dublin, Ireland route.

Her name North Wall reflected the LNWR's terminus in Dublin.

She was scrapped in 1904.
