= PS Stanley (1864) =

19th century passenger vessel

History
- Name: 1864–1890: PS Stanley
- Owner: 1864–1888: London and North Western Railway; 1888–1889: Irish National Steamboat Company; 1889–1890: A. A. Laird and Company
- Operator: 1864–1888: London and North Western Railway; 1888–1889: Irish National Steamboat Company; 1889–1890: A. A. Laird and Company
- Port of registry: (United Kingdom)
- Route: 1864–1889: Holyhead – Dublin
- Builder: Caird & Company, Greenock
- Yard number: 114B
- Launched: 1864
- Out of service: 1890
- Fate: Broken up at Bowling.

General characteristics
- Tonnage: 782 gross register tons (GRT)
- Length: 239.2 ft (72.9 m)
- Beam: 29.1 ft (8.9 m)
- Draught: 14.9 ft (4.5 m)

PS Stanley was a paddle steamer passenger vessel operated by the London and North Western Railway from 1864 to 1888.

== History ==
She was built by Caird & Company of Greenock and launched in 1864.

On 20 February 1877, she collided with Duke of Sutherland and was driven ashore at Holyhead, Anglesey. All on board were rescued. She as on a voyage from Holyhead to Dublin. She was sold to the Irish National Steamboat Company in August 1888, and in 1890 passed to A. A. Laird and Company. She was broken up shortly afterwards.
