= PS Violet =

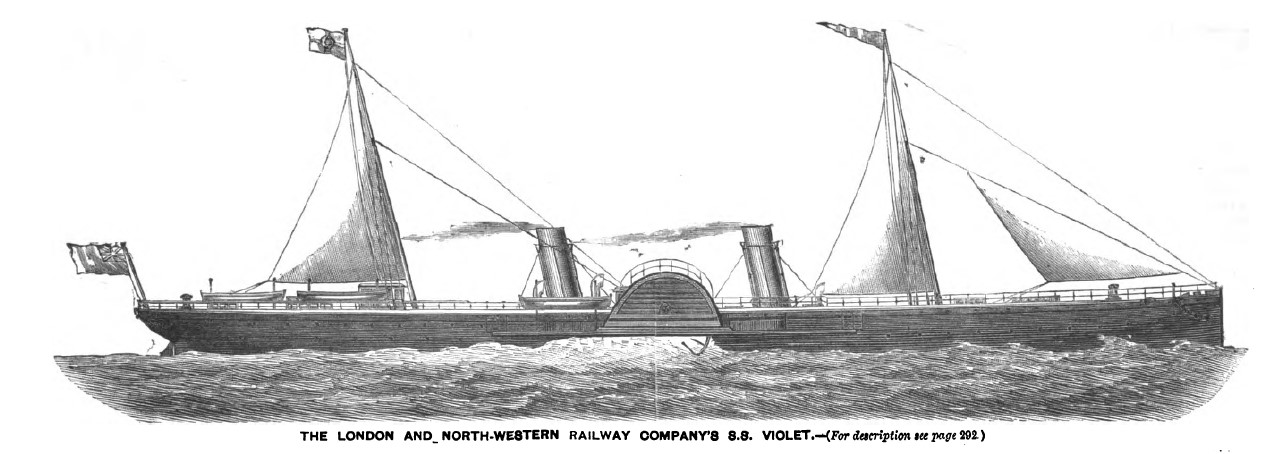
- Violet

History
- Name: Violet
- Owner: 1880: London and North Western Railway; 1902: Liverpool and Douglas Steamers
- Operator: 1880: London and North Western Railway
- Port of registry: (United Kingdom) Dublin
- Route: Holyhead – Dublin
- Builder: Laird Brothers, Birkenhead
- Yard number: 468
- Launched: 1880
- Out of service: 1902

General characteristics
- Tonnage: 1,035 gross register tons (GRT)
- Length: 300 ft (91 m)
- Beam: 33.1 ft (10.1 m)
- Depth: 14.4 ft (4.4 m)
- Speed: 17 3/4 knots (32.9 km/h)

SS Violet was a passenger paddle steamer operated by the London and North Western Railway from 1880 to 1902. (PS is a later designation used to differentiate paddle steamers from propeller steamships)

== History ==
She was built by Laird Brothers, Birkenhead for the London and North Western Railway in 1880. She was a sister ship to Lily and built to the same specification. They were intended to operate a new overnight service between Holyhead and Dublin. The service previously had only been during the daytime.

The ship had new boilers and engines fitted in 1890–91 to increase the speed from 17 3/4 knots (32.9 km/h) to 19 1/2 knots (36.1 km/h).

She was sold in 1902 to Liverpool and Douglas Steamers Ltd.

== Specification ==
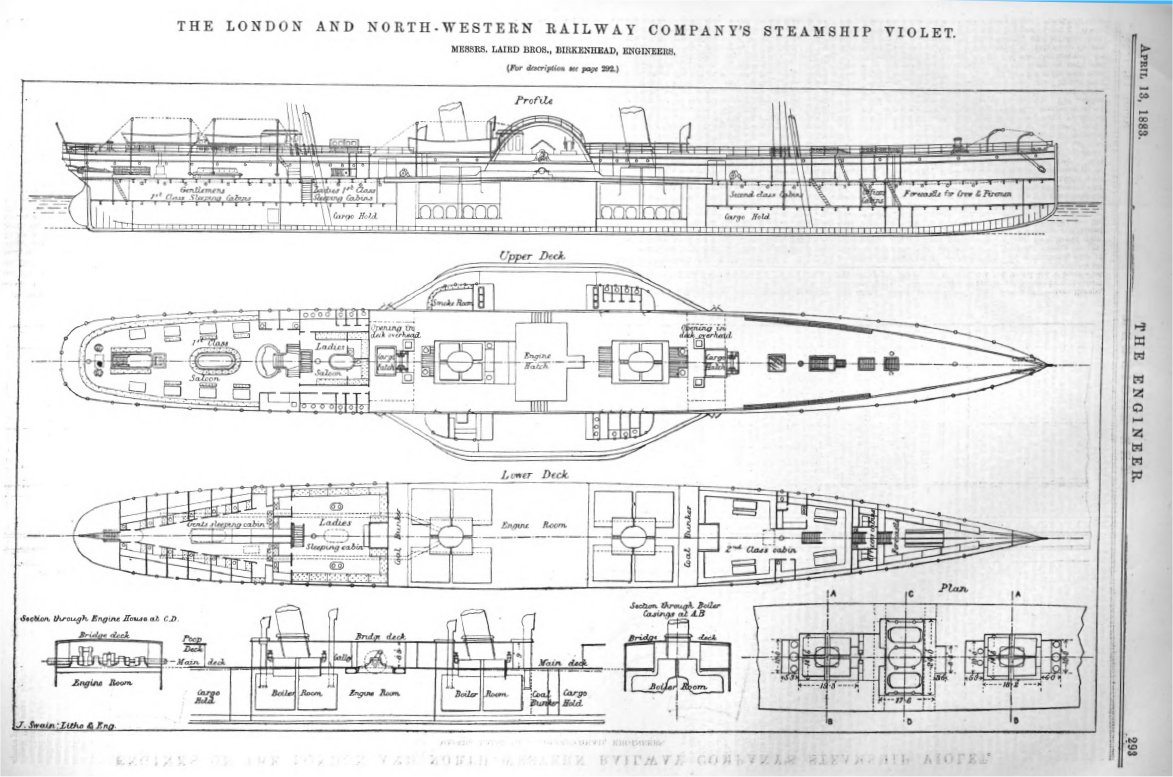
Plan and elevation of SS Violet

In 1883 The Engineer published specifications for Violet (and sister ship Lily) as follows:

Dimensions : 310 feet long overall, 300 feet 6 inches between perpendiculars, 33 feet beam, drawing 14 ft 4inches.

Passengers : Certified by Board of Trade to carry 475 deck passengers and 415 saloon passengers.

Engines : Twin cylinder oscillating engines with jet condensers. Cylinder bore 78 inches, stroke 7 feet with double piston rods and crossheads. Crankshaft 18inch diameter. Each cylinder had two slide-valves operated by link motion. Mean indicated horsepower over 3 hours is 3220 and propeller speed is 30 revolutions per minute.

Boilers : Eight rectangular boilers supplying steam at 30 psi. The boilers contained a total of 2152 tubes, total heating surface of 12215 square feet, and total grate area of 470 square feet.

Paddle Wheels : 27 feet 8 inches diameter, with floats 11 feet wide, and 4 feet 6 inches deep.

On the Holyhead to Kingstown crossing she was about 15 minutes faster than the earlier ships Shamrock and Rose.
