= TSS Slieve Donard =

Passenger and cargo boat

History
- Name: 1921–1954: TSS Slieve Donard
- Owner: 1921–1923: London and North Western Railway; 1923–1948: London, Midland and Scottish Railway; 1948–1954: British Transport Commission
- Operator: 1912–1923: London and North Western Railway; 1923–1948: London, Midland and Scottish Railway; 1948–1954: British Transport Commission
- Port of registry: (United Kingdom)
- Route: 1921–1954: Holyhead – Dublin
- Builder: Vickers Limited
- Launched: 6 October 1921
- Out of service: 21 January 1954
- Fate: Scrapped 1954 at Troon

General characteristics
- Tonnage: 1,115 gross register tons (GRT)
- Length: 299.9 ft (91.4 m)
- Beam: 39.1 ft (11.9 m)
- Draught: 14.2 ft (4.3 m)
- Speed: 16 knots

TSS Slieve Donard was a steam turbine passenger and cargo vessel operated by the London and North Western Railway from 1921 to 1923, and the London, Midland and Scottish Railway from 1923 to 1948.

== History ==
She was built by Cammell Laird in 1921 as the last ship for the London and North Western Railway and put on the Holyhead – Dublin route.

She was named after the Slieve Donard (Irish: Sliabh Dónairt, derived from Sliabh Domhanghairt/Domhanghart) mountain in County Down, Northern Ireland. It is the highest peak of the Mourne Mountains.

She was generally employed on the Thursday mid-day trip from Dublin for the cattle-dealers returning from market.

She was scrapped in 1954.
