= TSS Slieve Gallion =

History
- Name: 1908–1937: TSS Slieve Gallion
- Owner: 1908–1923: London and North Western Railway; 1923–1937: London, Midland and Scottish Railway
- Operator: 1908–1923: London and North Western Railway; 1923–1937: London, Midland and Scottish Railway
- Port of registry: (United Kingdom)
- Builder: Vickers, Sons & Maxim Ltd, Barrow-in-Furness
- Launched: 4 December 1907
- Completed: March 1908
- Fate: Scrapped May 1937

General characteristics
- Tonnage: 1,071 gross register tons (GRT)
- Length: 299.5 ft (91.3 m)
- Beam: 37.2 ft (11.3 m)
- Draught: 14.1 ft (4.3 m)

TSS Slieve Gallion was a twin screw steamer cargo vessel operated by the London and North Western Railway from 1908 to 1923, and the London, Midland and Scottish Railway from 1923 to 1937.

== History ==
She was completed by Vickers, Sons & Maxim Ltd of Barrow-in-Furness for the London and North Western Railway in 1908.

She was named after the Slieve Gallion mountain in County Londonderry. She was very similar in specification to her sister ship, Slieve Bloom.

She was sold in May 1937 to Arnott Young and Company in Dalmuir for breaking, and replaced by the Slieve Bawn.
