= PS Earl Spencer (1874) =

History
- Name: Earl Spencer
- Namesake: John Spencer, 5th Earl Spencer, Lord Lieutenant of Ireland from 1868 to 1874
- Owner: London and North Western Railway
- Operator: London and North Western Railway
- Port of registry: (United Kingdom of Great Britain and Ireland) London, United Kingdom (1874–85); (United Kingdom of Great Britain and Ireland) Dublin, United Kingdom (1885–96)
- Route: 1874–1896: Holyhead – Greenore
- Builder: Laird Brothers
- Yard number: 416
- Launched: 4 July 1874
- Out of service: 1896
- Identification: United Kingdom Official Number: 70620
- Fate: Scrapped 1896

General characteristics
- Tonnage: 855 gross register tons (GRT), 374 net register tons (NRT)
- Length: 253 feet 7 inches (77.29 m)
- Beam: 29 feet 4 inches (8.94 m)
- Draught: 14 feet 7 inches (4.45 m)
- Installed power: 2-cylinder oscillating steam engine
- Propulsion: Paddle wheels

PS Earl Spencer was a paddle steamer passenger vessel operated by the London and North Western Railway from 1874 to 1896.

== Description ==
Earl Spencer was 253 feet 7 inches (77.29 m) long, with a beam of 29 feet 4 inches (8.94 m) and a depth of 14 feet 7 inches (4.45 m). She was powered by a two-cylinder oscillating steam engine, which had cylinders of 64 inches (160 cm) diameter by 72 inches (180 cm) stroke. She was assessed at 855 GRT, 374 NRT.

== History ==
Earl Spencer was built in 1874 as yard number 416 by Laird Brothers, Birkenhead, Cheshire for the London and North Western Railway. She was launched on 4 July. Her port of registry was London and the United Kingdom Official Number 70620 was allocated. On 17 October 1874, she collided with the schooner Merlin in the Irish Sea whilst on a voyage from Greenore, County Louth to Holyhead, Anglesey. Merlin sank. Her three crew were rescued by Earl Spencer and landed at Holyhead. In 1885, her port of registry was changed to Dublin. On 7 January 1888, she became stranded on the breakwater at Holyhead. Her 57 passengers were rescued, 50 by rocket apparatus and the rest by the Holyhead lifeboat. She was scrapped at Preston, Lancashire in the second quarter of 1896.
