= TSS Scotia (1920) =

Steamship

History
- Name: 1921–1940: TSS Scotia
- Owner: 1921–1923: London and North Western Railway; 1923–1940: London, Midland and Scottish Railway
- Operator: 1921–1923: London and North Western Railway; 1923–1940: London, Midland and Scottish Railway
- Port of registry: (United Kingdom)
- Route: 1921–1940: Holyhead – Dún Laoghaire
- Builder: William Denny and Brothers, Dumbarton
- Yard number: 1037
- Launched: 16 November 1920
- Fate: Bombed and sunk at Dunkirk 1 June 1940

General characteristics
- Tonnage: 3,454 gross register tons (GRT)
- Length: 380.5 ft (116.0 m)
- Beam: 45.2 ft (13.8 m)
- Draught: 17.2 ft (5.2 m)

TSS Scotia was a twin-screw steamer passenger vessel operated by the London and North Western Railway from 1921 to 1923, and the London, Midland and Scottish Railway from 1923 to 1940.

== History ==
She was built by William Denny and Brothers of Dumbarton and launched in 1920.

On 1 June 1940 she was bombed by German aircraft during the Dunkirk evacuation. The destroyer HMS Esk came alongside and rescued nearly 1,000 troops. The destroyer HMS Worcester was nearby and also picked up some survivors. Twenty-eight of her crew and an estimated 200 to 300 French troops were killed.
