= TSS Slieve More =

History
- Name: 1932–1965: TSS Slieve More
- Owner: 1932–1948: London, Midland and Scottish Railway; 1948–1965: British Transport Commission
- Operator: 1932–1948: London, Midland and Scottish Railway; 1948–1965: British Transport Commission
- Port of registry: (United Kingdom)
- Route: 1932–1965: Heysham – Belfast and Holyhead – Dublin
- Builder: William Denny and Brothers, Dumbarton
- Yard number: 1258
- Launched: 25 January 1932
- Fate: Scrapped 6 October 1965

General characteristics
- Tonnage: 1,409 gross register tons (GRT)
- Length: 299.5 ft (91.3 m)
- Beam: 44.6 ft (13.6 m)

TSS Slieve More was a twin screw steamer passenger vessel operated by the London, Midland and Scottish Railway from 1930 to 1948, and the British Transport Commission from 1948 to 1965.

== History ==
She was built by William Denny and Brothers of Dumbarton and launched in 1932.
