= TSS Cambria (1920) =

Passenger vessel

History
- Name: 1921–48: Cambria; 1948–49: Cambria II
- Owner: 1921–23: London and North Western Railway; 1923–48: London, Midland and Scottish Railway; 1948–49: British Transport Commission
- Operator: 1921–1923: London and North Western Railway; 1923–48: London, Midland and Scottish Railway; 1948–49: British Transport Commission
- Port of registry: (United Kingdom)
- Route: 1921–48: Holyhead – Dún Laoghaire
- Builder: William Denny and Brothers, Dumbarton
- Yard number: 1036
- Launched: 31 August 1920
- Maiden voyage: 1921
- Out of service: 23 July 1949
- Fate: Scrapped 1949

General characteristics
- Tonnage: 3,445 GRT
- Length: 380.6 ft (116.0 m)
- Beam: 45.2 ft (13.8 m)

TSS Cambria was a twin screw steamer passenger vessel operated by the London and North Western Railway from 1921 to 1923, and the London, Midland and Scottish Railway from 1923 to 1948.

== History ==
She was built by William Denny and Brothers of Dumbarton and launched in 1920, but she did not come into service with the London and North Western Railway until 1921.

On 7 August, 1938 she ran down in dense fog and sank British steam trawler Alcazar in St. George's Channel at 53°19′N 05°25′W. Three persons, her captain, one crewmember, and one passenger were rescued by Cambria. Seven crew were killed. A court found Cambria's master responsible for the loss of life and vessel, and his certificate was revoked for a year.

In 1948 she was renamed TSS Cambria II in preparation for a new vessel of the same name, the motor vessel Cambria and the following year she was scrapped by the British Transport Commission.
