= TSS Curraghmore =

History
- Name: 1919–30: Curraghmore; 1930–35: Duke of Abercorn
- Owner: 1919–23: London and North Western Railway; 1923–35: London, Midland and Scottish Railway
- Operator: 1919–23: London and North Western Railway; 1923–35: London, Midland and Scottish Railway
- Port of registry: (United Kingdom)
- Builder: William Denny and Brothers, Dumbarton
- Yard number: 1026
- Laid down: 1914
- Launched: 30 April 1919
- Out of service: 1 October 1935
- Fate: Scrapped 1935

General characteristics
- Tonnage: 1,587 gross register tons (GRT)
- Length: 310 ft (94 m)
- Beam: 40 ft (12 m)

TSS Curraghmore was a twin screw steamer passenger vessel operated by the London and North Western Railway from 1919 to 1923, and the London, Midland and Scottish Railway from 1923 to 1935.

== History ==
She was built by William Denny and Brothers of Dumbarton and launched in 1919. She had been laid down in 1914 but her completion and delivery was delayed by the First World War.

In 1930 she was transferred to Heysham and renamed Duke of Abercorn. In 1935 she was scrapped.
