= TSS Snowdon =

Steam turbine cargo vessel

History
- Name: 1902–1935: TSS Snowdon
- Owner: 1902–1935: London and North Western Railway
- Operator: 1902–1935: London and North Western Railway
- Port of registry: (United Kingdom)
- Route: 1902–1935: Holyhead – Dublin
- Builder: Cammell Laird
- Yard number: 651
- Launched: 1902
- Out of service: 1935
- Fate: Scrapped September 1935

General characteristics
- Tonnage: 1,110 gross register tons (GRT)
- Length: 299.9 ft (91.4 m)
- Beam: 36.6 ft (11.2 m)
- Draught: 14 ft (4.3 m)

TSS Snowdon was a steam turbine cargo vessel operated by the London and North Western Railway from 1902 to 1935.

== History ==
She was built by Cammell Laird for the London and North Western Railway in 1902 and put on the Holyhead – Dublin route.

She was scrapped in 1935 at Port Glasgow.
