= TSS Duke of Connaught =

History
- Name: Duke of Connaught
- Namesake: Prince Arthur, Duke of Connaught and Strathearn
- Owner: 1902–1923: London and North Western Railway; 1923–1934: London, Midland and Scottish Railway
- Operator: 1902–1923: London and North Western Railway; 1923–1934: London, Midland and Scottish Railway
- Route: 1902–1930: Belfast – Fleetwood; 1930–1934: Hull – Zeebrugge
- Builder: John Brown & Company
- Yard number: 353
- Launched: 20 August 1902
- Out of service: 1934
- Fate: Scrapped 1934

General characteristics
- Tonnage: 1,680 gross register tons (GRT)
- Length: 315 ft (96 m)
- Beam: 38.2 ft (11.6 m)
- Speed: 20 knots

TSS Duke of Connaught was a passenger vessel operated jointly by the London and North Western Railway and the Lancashire and Yorkshire Railway from 1902 to 1922. In the LYR-LNWR naming system, she was named for Prince Arthur, Duke of Connaught and Strathearn (1850–1942), a younger son of Queen Victoria and Prince Albert.

== History ==
The Duke of Connaught was built at Cammell Laird, as part of a fleet of seven ships delivered by the company between 1892 and 1909. She operated on the Fleetwood-Belfast route and passed into the hands of the LNWR in 1922 and the London, Midland and Scottish Railway in 1923. In 1921 she was re-boilered by Vickers. The Duke of Connaught remained on the Fleetwood-Belfast route until 1930 when she was transferred to the Hull to Zeebrugge service. She sailed between Hull and Zeebrugge in the summer, returning to the Fleetwood-Belfast service for the winter months. In the early 1930s she also sailed on cruises, such as the one advertised for 13–17 June 1931 in which she sailed from Fleetwood to Stromness, Aberdeen and Hull. The Duke of Connaught was scrapped in 1934.
