= TSS Anglia =

History
- Name: 1920–35: TSS Anglia
- Owner: 1920–23: London and North Western Railway; 1923–35: London, Midland and Scottish Railway
- Operator: 1920–23: London and North Western Railway; 1923–35: London, Midland and Scottish Railway
- Port of registry: (United Kingdom)
- Route: 1920–1935: Holyhead – Dún Laoghaire
- Builder: William Denny and Brothers, Dumbarton
- Yard number: 1034
- Launched: 11 November 1919
- Out of service: 14 October 1935
- Fate: Scrapped 1935

General characteristics
- Tonnage: 3,460 gross register tons (GRT)
- Length: 380.5 ft (116.0 m)
- Beam: 45.2 ft (13.8 m)
- Speed: 25 knots

TSS Anglia was a twin screw steamer passenger vessel operated by the London and North Western Railway from 1920 to 1923, and the London, Midland and Scottish Railway from 1923 to 1935.

== History ==
She was built by William Denny and Brothers of Dumbarton and launched on 11 November 1919.

On 15 January 1922 she collided with the breakwater at Holyhead harbour, and was laid up from 1924. She was then only used infrequently, typically during holiday periods.

In 1935 she was scrapped.
