= North Lancashire Steam Navigation Company =

- Industry: Shipping
- Founded: 1843
- Founder: Frederick Kemp
- Headquarters: Fleetwood
- Area served: Fleetwood, Belfast, Derry

The North Lancashire Steam Navigation Company provided shipping services between Fleetwood and ports in northern Ireland, principally Belfast from 1843 to 1870.

== History ==
The founder of Fleetwood, Peter Hesketh-Fleetwood, started occasional shipping services from around 1841 using a paddle steamer. Scheduled services began in 1843 when Frederick Kemp formed the North Lancashire Steam Navigation Company. Initially there were two services per week, leaving Fleetwood on Wednesdays and Saturdays and returned on Mondays and Fridays.

By 1853 trains to Fleetwood railway station provided a link to the service. By 1892 sailings were timed to meet the train service.

Steamers carried cargo, mostly Irish cattle, as well as the Royal Mail. The service to Derry terminated in 1912.

In 1870 the services from Fleetwood were taken over by the joint operation of the Lancashire & Yorkshire Railway and the London & North Western Railway.
