= PS Anglia =

Paddle steamer passenger vessel

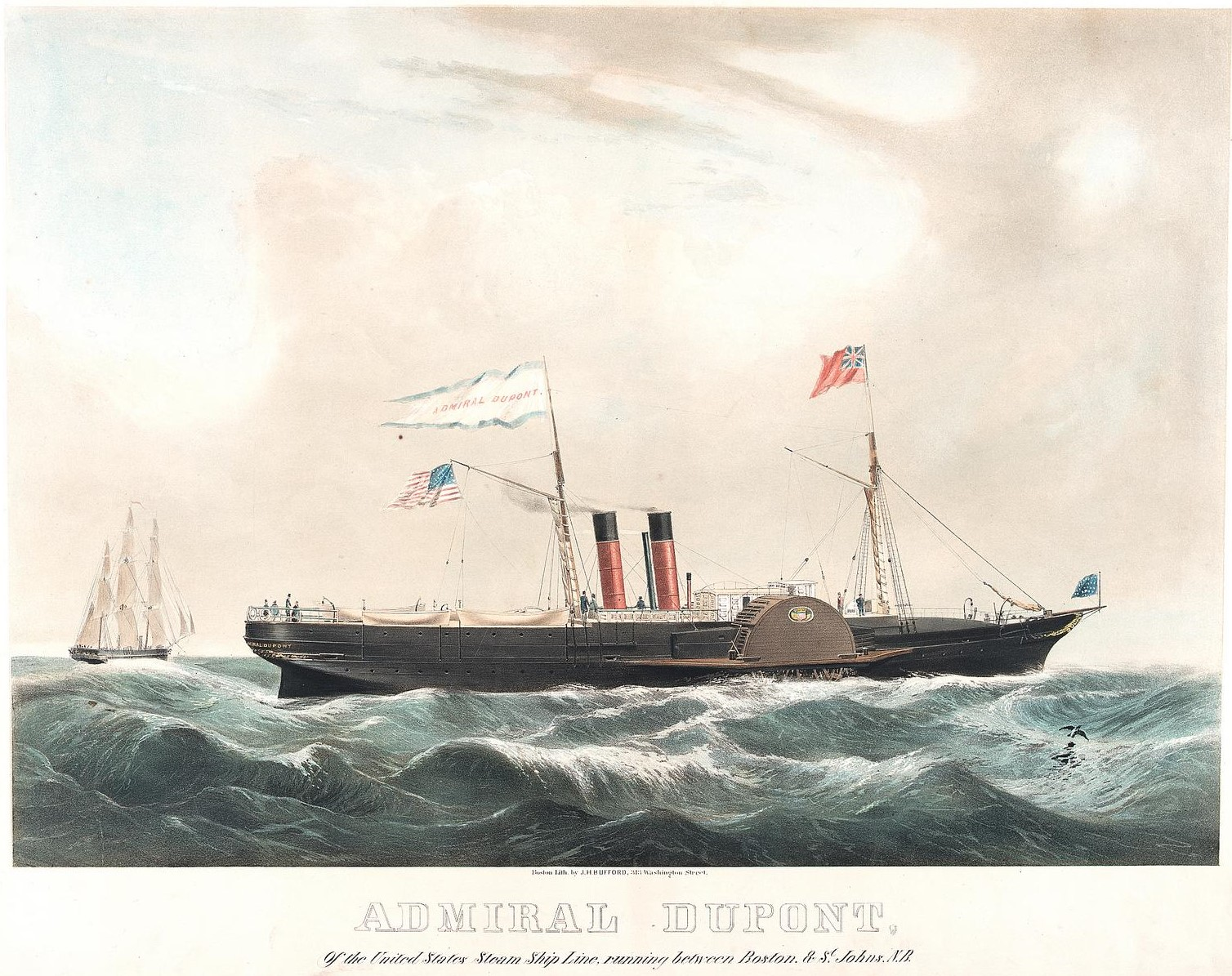
- PS Admiral Dupont, ex-PS Anglia.

History
- Name: 1848–1863: PS Anglia; 1864–1865: PS Admiral Dupont
- Owner: 1848–1859: Chester and Holyhead Railway; 1859–1861: London and North Western Railway; 1861–1862: Confederate States of America; 1862–1865: Union States of America
- Operator: 1848–1859: Chester and Holyhead Railway; 1859–1861: London and North Western Railway; 1861–1862: Confederate States of America; 1862–1865: Union States of America
- Port of registry: (United Kingdom)
- Builder: Ditchburn and Mare, Blackwall
- Launched: 1847
- Out of service: 1865
- Fate: Sunk after collision

General characteristics
- Tonnage: 473 gross register tons (GRT)
- Length: 190.5 ft (58.1 m)
- Beam: 26.2 ft (8.0 m)
- Draught: 13.8 ft (4.2 m)

PS Anglia was a paddle steamer passenger vessel operated by the Chester and Holyhead Railway from 1847 to 1859 and the London and North Western Railway from 1859 to 1861.

== History ==
She was built by Ditchburn and Mare, Blackwall for the Chester and Holyhead Railway, which was taken over by the London and North Western Railway in 1859.

She was sold in 1861 and used as a blockade runner by the Confederate States of America. Captured in 1862 by the Union and renamed Admiral Dupont after Admiral Samuel Francis Du Pont

On 7 June 1865 she left New York City for Fortress Monroe with a detachment of United States troops. On 8 June 1865 at 4.20am, she collided with a sailing vessel, the Stadaconda (or Studaconda), and was sunk in about three minutes.
