= PS Isabella =

History
- Name: 1877–1898: PS Isabella
- Owner: 1877–1898: London and North Western Railway
- Operator: 1877–1898: London and North Western Railway
- Port of registry: United Kingdom
- Route: 1877–1898: Holyhead - Greenore
- Builder: Laird Brothers, Birkenhead
- Yard number: 443
- Launched: 1877
- Out of service: 1898
- Fate: Scrapped 1898

General characteristics
- Tonnage: 831 gross register tons (GRT)
- Length: 254.2 ft (77.5 m)
- Beam: 30 ft (9.1 m)
- Draught: 14.2 ft (4.3 m)

PS Isabella was a paddle steamer passenger vessel operated by the London and North Western Railway from 1877 to 1898.

== History ==
She was built by Laird Brothers for the London and North Western Railway in 1877 and was the first of the company's ships to be built of steel, which was made in-house at Crewe Works. She may have been named after Isabella Aspinall (née Moon), a sister of the company's then chairman Richard Moon. She was launched on Thursday 11 October 1877 from the Laird Brothers yard in Birkenhead, by Mrs Bland, wife of James Bland, one of the directors of the railway company.
