= PS Alexandra (1863) =

British steamship

History
- Name: 1863–1889: Alexandra; 1889: Elise Schultze; ca. 1899: Amelie
- Owner: 1863–1889: London and North Western Railway; 1889: F. Schultze, Rostock
- Operator: 1863–1889: London and North Western Railway
- Port of registry: (United Kingdom) London
- Builder: John Laird, Birkenhead
- Yard number: 305
- Launched: 1863
- Out of service: 1902
- Identification: British ON 48563
- Fate: Stranded 1902

General characteristics
- Tonnage: 703 gross register tons (GRT)
- Length: 226.6 ft (69.1 m)
- Beam: 28.3 ft (8.6 m)
- Draught: 16 ft (4.9 m)

PS Alexandra was a paddle steamer passenger vessel operated by the London and North Western Railway from 1863 to 1889.

== History ==
She was built by John Laird, Birkenhead for the London and North Western Railway in 1863. He maiden voyage was on Saturday 28 November 1863 when she sailed from Holyhead to Dublin Quay in 4 hours 20 minutes. The return journey took 4 hours 36 minutes. The report in the Liverpool Mercury on 1 December 1863 states that this was the fastest crossing to date.

On 5 August 1886 she was in collision with the Mail Steamer Munster of the City of Dublin Steam Packet Company in the Irish Sea. On Wednesday 26 October 1887, she was involved in another accident when leaving Holyhead port she was struck by large waves in the side which drove in the bulkheads. One man, John Fleming of Lavallyroe, County Mayo, was crushed to death and three others were seriously injured.

Sold in 1889 to F Schultze, Rostock. Converted to a barque and renamed Elise Schultze. On a voyage from Cardiff to Buenos Aires, on 13 October 1890 she put into St. Michael's having suffered an explosion on 10 October.

She was sold in Hamburg in 1896. By 1899 she was owned by Mme Naro Ertaud of St. Nazaire as the Amelie. She was lost by stranding in 1902.
