= PS Lily =

Passenger ship of the United Kingdom

History
- Name: Lily
- Owner: 1880: London and North Western Railway; 1900: Liverpool and Douglas Steamers
- Operator: 1880: London and North Western Railway
- Port of registry: (United Kingdom) Dublin
- Route: Holyhead – Dublin
- Builder: Laird Brothers, Birkenhead
- Yard number: 467
- Launched: 13 March 1880
- In service: June 1880
- Out of service: April 1900
- Fate: Scrapped 1905

General characteristics
- Tonnage: 1,035 gross register tons (GRT)
- Length: 300 ft (91 m)
- Beam: 33.1 ft (10.1 m)
- Depth: 14.4 ft (4.4 m)
- Speed: 17 3/4 knots (32.9 km/h)

PS Lily was a passenger paddle steamer operated by the London and North Western Railway from 1880 to 1900.

== History ==
She was built by Laird Brothers, Birkenhead for the London and North Western Railway in 1880. She was a sister ship to Violet, and built to the same specification. They were intended to operate a new overnight service between Holyhead and Dublin. The service previously had only been during the day time.

The ship had new boilers and engines fitted in 1890–91 to increase the speed from 17 3/4 knots (32.9 km/h) to 19 1/2 knots (36.1 km/h). In 1892 she suffered a failure in a piston rod when between Dublin and Holyhead. She was towed for a time by the Irene but after three hours the hawser parted. Cambrian was sent out to rescue her, but when she was found, Lily was making slow progress under her own steam. She took 10 hours to reach Holyhead.

She was sold in April 1900 to Liverpool and Douglas Steamers Ltd, and scrapped at Preston in September, 1905.

== Specification ==
In 1883 The Engineer published specifications for Violet and sister ship Lily as follows:

Dimensions : 310 feet long overall, 300 feet 6 inches between perpendiculars, 33 feet beam, drawing 14ft 4inches.

Passengers : Certified by Board of Trade to carry 475 deck passengers and 415 saloon passengers.

Engines : Twin cylinder oscillating engines with jet condensers. Cylinder bore 78 inches, stroke 7 feet with double piston rods and crossheads. Crankshaft 18inch diameter. Each cylinder had two slide-valves operated by link motion. Mean indicated horsepower over 3 hours is 3220 and propeller speed is 30 revolutions per minute.

Boilers : Eight rectangular boilers supplying steam at 30 psi. The boilers contained a total of 2152 tubes, total heating surface of 12215 square feet, and total grate area of 470 square feet.

Paddle Wheels : 27 feet 8 inches diameter, with floats 11 feet wide, and 4 feet 6 inches deep.

It was stated in the article in The Engineer regarding the sister ships that "the Violet is a little the faster of the two", but it did not elaborate on how this conclusion was reached.
