= PS Shamrock (1876) =

Passenger vessel

History
- Name: 1876–1894: PS Shamrock
- Owner: 1876–1894: London and North Western Railway
- Operator: 1876–1894: London and North Western Railway
- Port of registry: (United Kingdom)
- Route: 1876–1894: Holyhead - Greenore
- Builder: Cammell Laird
- Yard number: 429
- Launched: 1876
- Out of service: 1898

General characteristics
- Tonnage: 1,178 gross register tons (GRT)
- Length: 291.8 ft (88.9 m)
- Beam: 32.2 ft (9.8 m)
- Draught: 15.7 ft (4.8 m)

PS Shamrock was a paddle steamer passenger vessel operated by the London and North Western Railway from 1876 to 1898.

== History ==
She was built by Cammell Laird for the London and North Western Railway in 1876.

On 15 January 1877, she collided with the schooner John Bright at Holyhead, Anglesey, severely damaged the schooner. Shamrock rescued her crew and the schooner was beached. On 9 October 1880, She ran down and sunk the schooner Hannah off the coast of County Dublin, killing three of the schooner's four crew. Shamrock rescued the survivor. The schooner was not showing any lights. On 12 April 1881, she ran down and sunk the tug General Havelock in the River Liffey. There were no deaths.

She was taken out of service in August 1898.
