= TSS South Stack =

History
- Name: 1900–1931: TSS South Stack
- Owner: 1900–1923: London and North Western Railway; 1923–1931: London, Midland and Scottish Railway
- Operator: 1900–1923: London and North Western Railway; 1923–1931: London, Midland and Scottish Railway
- Port of registry: (United Kingdom)
- Route: 1900–1931: Holyhead – Dublin
- Builder: Cammell Laird
- Yard number: 641
- Launched: 30 June 1900
- Out of service: 1931
- Fate: Scrapped 1931

General characteristics
- Tonnage: 1,066 gross register tons (GRT)
- Length: 299.5 ft (91.3 m)
- Beam: 36 ft (11 m)
- Draught: 13.5 ft (4.1 m)

TSS South Stack was a twin screw steamer passenger and cargo vessel operated by the London and North Western Railway from 1900 to 1923, and the London, Midland and Scottish Railway from 1923 to 1931.

== History ==
She was built by Cammell Laird for the London and North Western Railway in 1900. She was named after the island South Stack, just off Holyhead.

She was decommissioned in 1931.
