= TrSS Greenore =

History
- Name: 1912–1926: TrSS Greenore
- Owner: 1912–1923: London and North Western Railway; 1923–1926: London, Midland and Scottish Railway
- Operator: 1912–1923: London and North Western Railway; 1923–1926: London, Midland and Scottish Railway
- Port of registry: (United Kingdom)
- Route: 1912–1926: Holyhead - Greenore
- Builder: Cammell Laird
- Yard number: 782
- Launched: 20 February 1912
- Out of service: 1926
- Fate: Scrapped 1926

General characteristics
- Tonnage: 1,488 gross register tons (GRT)
- Length: 306 ft (93 m)
- Beam: 40.7 ft (12.4 m)
- Draught: 14.5 ft (4.4 m)
- Installed power: Parsons Steam Turbine
- Speed: 20.5 knots

TrSS Greenore was a steam turbine passenger and cargo vessel operated by the London and North Western Railway from 1912 to 1923, and the London, Midland and Scottish Railway from 1923 to 1926.

== History ==
She was built by Cammell Laird for the London and North Western Railway in 1912 and put on the Holyhead - Greenore route to replace the paddle steamer Edith.

She was the only London and North Western Railway to be equipped with the Direct-Drive Triple-Screw arrangement.

She was scrapped in 1926.
