= TSS Rathmore =

Twin screw steamer passenger vessel

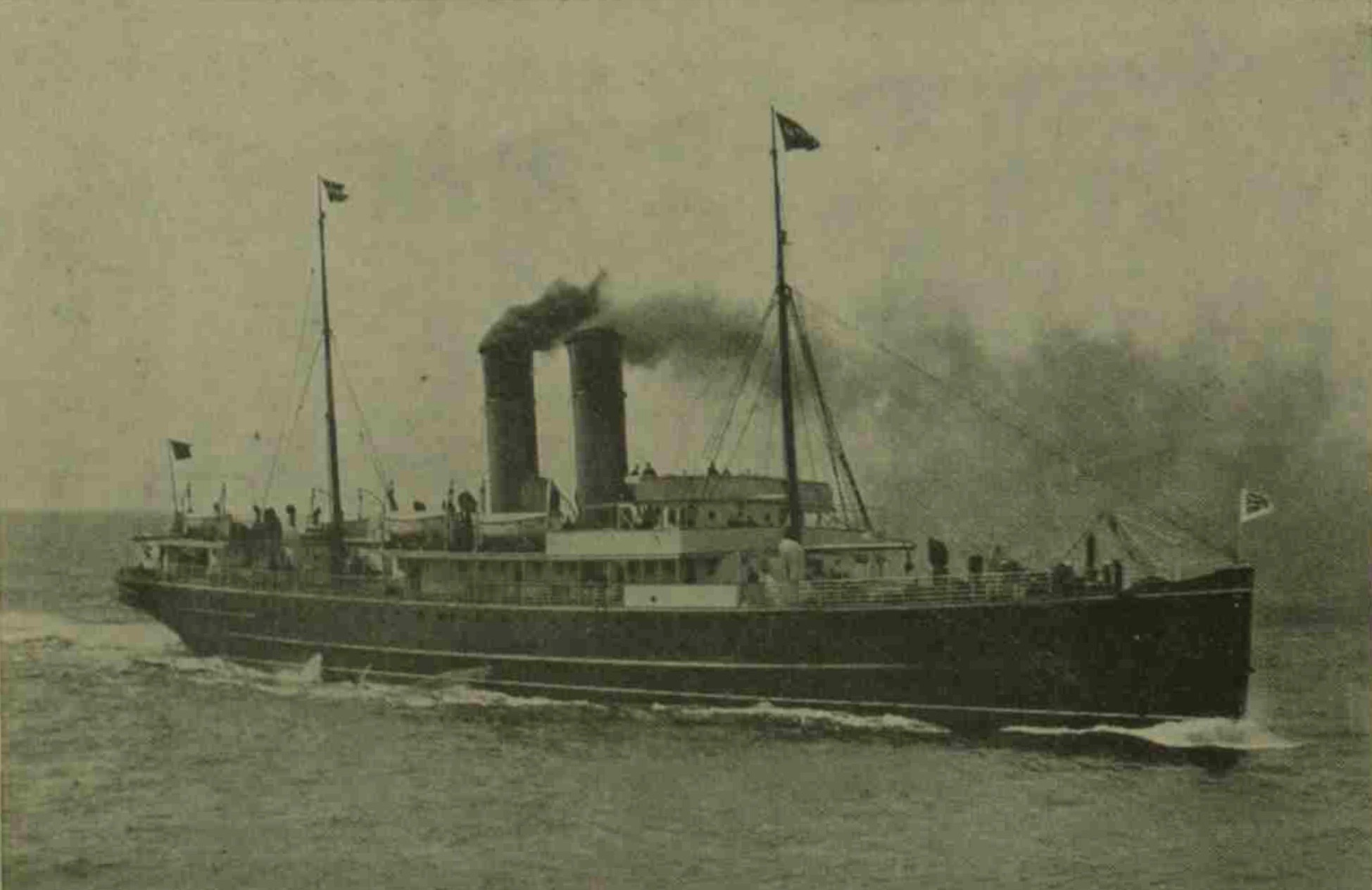
- TSS Rathmore from the Illustrated London News, 12 September 1908

History
- Name: 1908–1927: TSS Rathmore; 1927–1932: TSS Lorrain
- Owner: 1908–1923: London and North Western Railway; 1923–1927: London, Midland and Scottish Railway; 1927–1932: Angleterre-Lorraine-Alsace
- Operator: 1908–1923: London and North Western Railway; 1923–1927: London, Midland and Scottish Railway; 1927–1932: Angleterre-Lorraine-Alsace
- Port of registry: (United Kingdom)
- Route: 1908–1927: Holyhead - Greenore; 1927–1932: Tilbury - Dunkirk
- Builder: Vickers, Sons & Maxim Ltd, Barrow-in-Furness
- Launched: 3 March 1908
- Fate: Scrapped September 1932

General characteristics
- Tonnage: 1,569 gross register tons (GRT)
- Length: 299.5 ft (91.3 m)
- Beam: 40.2 ft (12.3 m)
- Draught: 15.5 ft (4.7 m)

TSS Rathmore was a twin screw steamer passenger vessel operated by the London and North Western Railway from 1908 to 1923, and the London, Midland and Scottish Railway from 1923 to 1927.

== History ==
She was built by Vickers, Sons & Maxim Ltd of Barrow-in-Furness for the London and North Western Railway in 1908. She was trialled at sea on 16 July, and completed the distance between the Skerries and Great Orme's Head at the speed of 21 knots. She entered service on 24 July 1908. She was larger both in length and breadth than the other ships on the Holyhead to Greenore service. Fifty state-rooms were provided, enabling one hundred passengers to enjoy private cabins. The total number of passengers for which the ship was certified was 1,366. A spacious ladies’ deck lounge was provided on the bridge deck, upholstered in peacock blue frieze velvet, with panelling in white enamel, and a stained-glass dome as the main decorative feature. The gentlemen were provided with a smoking room on the bridge deck, panelled in Austrian oak, upholstered in green Morocco leather, with a high dome skylight with stained glass. The ship was fitted with electricity for heating and lighting.

On 4 March 1918, she was sunk in a collision, and 26 people went missing, but was successfully raised and continued in service.

She was sold in 1927 to Angleterre-Lorraine-Alsace for the Tilbury to Dunkirk service, and was scrapped in 1932.
