= Greenore =

Port village in County Louth, Ireland

Greenore An Grianfort
- Village
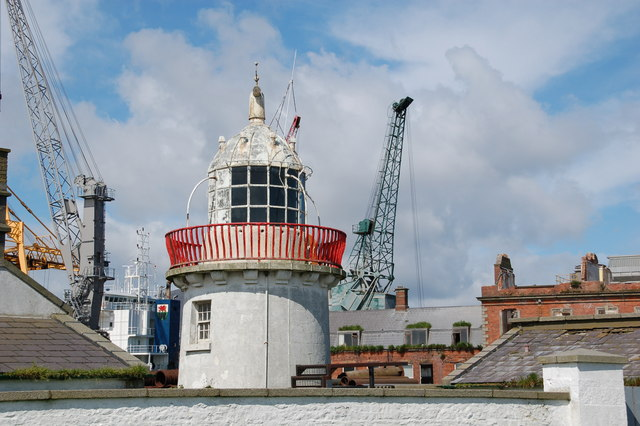
- Old lighthouse, Greenore harbour

- Location in Ireland
- Coordinates: 54.033°N 6.133°W
- Country: Ireland
- Province: Leinster
- Dáil Éireann: Louth
- Time zone: UTC±0 (WET)
  - Summer (DST): UTC+1 (IST)
- Eircode routing key: A91
- Telephone area code: +353(0)42

Greenore (Irish: An Grianfort) is a village, townland and deep water port on Carlingford Lough in County Louth, Ireland.

== History ==
A lighthouse was built on Greenore Point in 1830.

Several decades later, the Dundalk and Greenore Railway Act 1863 authorised the construction of the port and railway. The port was constructed in 1867 to provide links to Heysham and Fleetwood. The village was constructed to provide homes for the dock and railway workers of the Dundalk, Newry and Greenore Railway.

== Economy ==
Greenore has the only privately owned port in the Republic of Ireland. It has two berths and can handle vessels of up to 60,000 deadweight . In 1964, the then disused port was used to fit out the ships used for the pirate radio stations Radio Caroline and Radio Atlanta (later Radio Caroline South). The port was owned by Aodogan O'Rahilly (1904–2000) - father of Radio Caroline founder Ronan O'Rahilly from 1958 until 2000. In the 1970s there was regular freight shipping from the port to Bristol. In 2005 Greenore was Ireland's 10th largest port in terms of tonnage handled with 649,000 tonnes of goods handled.

Greenore is also a brand of whiskey produced by the nearby Cooley Distillery.

== Transport ==
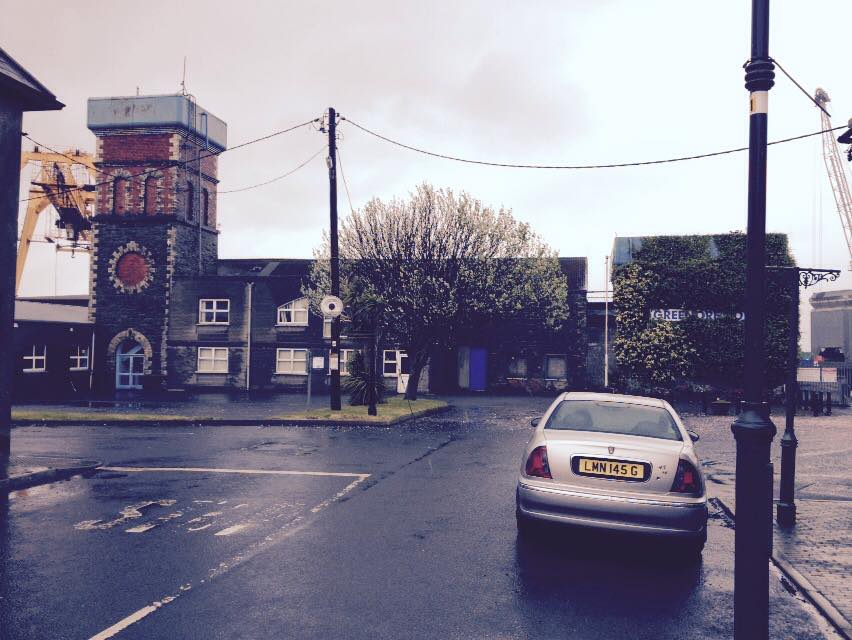
The former Greenore Station

On 21 July 2018 a ferry service commenced operations from Greenore, County Louth to Greencastle, County Down. The Scenic Carlingford Ferry operates a year-round service using its vessel, the Frazer Aisling Gabrielle.

From 1873 to 1951 there was a ferry service between Greenore and Holyhead. The London and North Western Railway constructed a substantial hotel and railway station to serve passengers using the ferry. The original railway line ran from Dundalk to Greenore and the first service was 1 May 1873 when the station opened. In 1876 the railway line was extended to Newry. In the 19th century there was a ferry from Greencastle to Greenore. The railway and the station closed on 1 January 1952 and was replaced by bus services to Dundalk and Newry.

Bus Éireann route 161 links Greenore to Dundalk, Carlingford, Omeath and Newry. There are four weekday journeys to Dundalk and four to Carlingford. On schooldays there is an additional morning journey to Newry. There is no service on Sundays.

== Sport ==
Greenore Golf Club was founded in 1896. It is a 6,647 yard course, with a par of 71.

== Notable residents ==
- Jimmy Magee, sports commentator

== See also ==
- List of towns and villages in Ireland
