= List of ship launches in 1880 =

The list of ship launches in 1880 includes a chronological list of some ships launched in 1880.

Date	Ship	Class / type	Builder	Location	Country	Notes
1 January	United Kingdom	Harland & Wolff	Belfast	Dawpool	Sailing ship	For North Western Shipping Company. or White Star Line.
10 January	Asia	Steamship	Messrs. C. Mitchell & Co.	Low Walker	United Kingdom	For E. Carr.
10 January	Firth of Dornoch	Steamship	Messrs. Russell & Co.	Cartsdyke	United Kingdom	For Messrs. James Spencer & Co.
10 January	Vagliano A	Steamship	Messrs. Thomas B. Seath & Co.	Rutherglen	United Kingdom	For Messrs. Vagliano Bros.
12 January	Fokien	Steamship	Messrs. Hall, Russell & Co.	Aberdeen	United Kingdom	For Messrs. Douglas, Lapraik & Co.
12 January	Lady Tyler	Paddle steamer	T. & W. Smith	North Shields	United Kingdom	For Great Eastern Railway.
12 January	Stakesby	Steamship	Joseph L. Thompson & Sons	Sunderland	United Kingdom	For John H. Barry & Partners.
13 January	Good Design	Fishing yawl	Whitby and Robin Hood's Bay Graving Dock Co.	Whitby	United Kingdom	For W. Thompson and others.
13 January	Loch Garry	Steamship	Messrs. Gourlay Bros. & Co.	Dundee	United Kingdom	For Loch Line.
13 January	Montgomeryshire	Steamship	London and Glasgow Engineering and Shipbuilding Company (Limited)	Govan	United Kingdom	For Messrs. Jenkins & Co.
13 January	Taramung	Steamship	Messrs. Russell & Co.	Cartsdyke	United Kingdom	For John M'Ilwraith.
13 January	Tregenna	Steamship	John Readhead & Sons	South Shields	United Kingdom	For Hain Line.
14 January	Scotia	Paddle steamer	Messrs. H. M'Intyre & Co.	Merksworth	United Kingdom	For William Buchanan.
15 January	Saône	Allier-class transport	Arsenal de Toulon	Toulon	France	For French Navy
15 January	Author	Steamship	Messrs. C. Mitchell & Co.	Low Walker	United Kingdom	For Messrs. T. & J. Harrison.
15 January	Jeune Amiral	Steamship	Messrs. Dobie & Co	Govan	United Kingdom	For private owner.
24 January	George Gowland	Steamship	Messrs. Ramage & Ferguson	Leith	United Kingdom	For George Gowland.
24 January	Vagliano B	Steamship	Messrs. Thomas B. Seath & Co.	Rutherglen	United Kingdom	For Messrs. Vagliano Bros.
26 January	Hercules	Steam yacht	George Brown	Wilmington	United Kingdom	For J. Palmer.
26 January	Muriel	Steamship	Messrs. Raylton Dixon & Co.	Middlesbrough	United Kingdom	For Messrs. Rayner & Murray.
26 January	Rambler	Algerine-class gunvessel	John Elder & Co.	Glasgow	United Kingdom	For Royal Navy.
27 January	Mary Anning	Steamship	Palmer's Shipbuilding and Iron Company (Limited)	Jarrow	United Kingdom	For private owner.
27 January	Toronto	Steamship	Messrs. Charles Connell & Co.	Scotstoun	United Kingdom	For Mississippi & Dominion Steamship Company (Limited).
28 January	Silver Dart	Fishing boat	Messrs. Hastings Bros.	Great Yarmouth	United Kingdom	For W. Thrower.
28 January	Thomas Owen	Schooner	John Williams	Portmadoc	United Kingdom	For private owner.
28 January	No. 11	Torpedo boat	Barrow Shipbuilding Co.	Barrow-in-Furness	United Kingdom	For Royal Navy.
28 January	No. 12	Torpedo boat	Barrow Shipbuilding Co.	Barrow-in-Furness	United Kingdom	For Royal Navy.
29 January	Balgownie	Steamship	Messrs. Alexander Hall & Co.	Aberdeen	United Kingdom	For Messrs. J. & A. Davidson.
30 January	Glenwilliam	Steamship	Messrs. H. M'Intyre & Co.	Paisley	United Kingdom	For Messrs. Hutson & Corbett.
31 January	Donata	Steamship	London and Glasgow Shipbuilding Company	Govan	United Kingdom	For Linea de Vapor Serra.
31 January	Lemnos	Steamship	Short Bros.	Sunderland	United Kingdom	For Lumsden, Byers & Co.
9 February	Benayo	Steamship	Messrs. W. H. Potter & Son	Liverpool	United Kingdom	For Joseph Hoult.
10 February	Lismore	Steamship	Messrs. Gourlay Bros. & Co	Dundee	United Kingdom	For Messrs. G. & B. Nicoll.
11 February	Beryl	Steamship	Messrs. M. Pearse & Co.	Stockton-on-Tees	United Kingdom	For private owner. Ran into by another steamship and severely damaged.
11 February	Gloamin'	Steamship	Caledon Shipbuilding	Dundee	United Kingdom	For Messrs. R. A. Mudie & Sons.
11 February	Jorge Juan	Steamship	Messrs. Archibald M'Millan & Son	Dumbarton	United Kingdom	For Messrs. Olano, Larrinaga & Co.
11 February	Utrecht	Steamship	Messrs. Raylton Dixon & Co.	Middlesbrough	United Kingdom	For Partenrederij Stoomboot Rederij Rotterdamsche Lloyd.
12 February	Ranger	Algerine-class gunvessel	John Elder & Co.	Govan	United Kingdom	For Royal Navy.
12 February	R. W. Boyd	Steamship	Messrs. John Readhead & Sons	South Shields	United Kingdom	For Messrs. Wilson, Taylor and partners.
12 February	Jane Hunter	Barquentine	John Watt	Dysart	United Kingdom	For William Gibson and others, or W. Johnstone and others.
13 February	Cornelia	Steam yacht	Messrs. Palmer's Shipbuilding and Iron Company (Limited)	Jarrow	United Kingdom	For Marquess of Londonderry.
14 February	Litoral	Steamship	Messrs. H. M'Intyre & Co.	Paisley	United Kingdom	For Torrado-Malero.
14 February	Oakville	Steamship	Messrs. W. Gray & Co.	West Hartlepool	United Kingdom	For Messrs. R. Shadforth & Co.
14 February	Violet	Paddle steamer	Messrs. Laird Bros.	Birkenhead	United Kingdom	For London and North Western Railway.
23 February	Corebo III	Steamship	Messrs. A. M'Millan & Son	Dumbarton	United Kingdom	For Sr. E. A. Piaggio.
24 February	Columbia	Coastal passenger liner	John Roach & Sons	Chester, Pennsylvania	United States	For Oregon Railroad and Navigation Company. She was the first commercial usage of Thomas Edison's incandescent light bulb.
24 February	Vladivostock	Steamship	Lobnitz & Co.	Renfrew	United Kingdom	For private owner.
25 February	Ivanhoe	Paddle steamer	D. & W. Henderson & Co.	Partick	United Kingdom	For Firth Coal Steam Packet Co, or Frith of Clyde Steam Packet Company (Limited).
26 February	Coanza	Steamship	John Elder & Co.	Govan	United Kingdom	For British & African Steam Navigation Co.
26 February	Cyfartha	Steamship	Palmer's Shipbuilding and Iron Co.	Jarrow	United Kingdom	For Messrs. Morel Bros. & Co.
27 February	Trojan	Steamship	Messrs. J. & G. Thomson	Glasgow	United Kingdom	For Union Steamship Co.
28 February	Kameruka	Steamship	Messrs. Russell & Co.	Greenock	United Kingdom	For Illawarra Steam Navigation Company.
28 February	Kangra	Steamship	William Denny & Bros.	Dumbarton	United Kingdom	For British India Steam Navigation Company, or Messrs. Gray, Dawes & Co.
28 February	Thomas Turnbull	Steamship	Messrs. Thomas Turnbull & Sons	Whitby	United Kingdom	For Messrs. Thomas Turnbull & Sons.
28 February	Unnamed	Tug	Messrs. Parfitt & Jones	Cardiff	United Kingdom	For Messrs. Cory Bros.
February	Etna	Tug	R. Chambers Jr.	Dumbarton	United Kingdom	For Queenstown Towing Company.
February	Toledo	Steamship	Messrs. Barclay, Curle & Co.	Whiteinch	United Kingdom	For Leith, Hull and Hamburg Steam Packet Co.
2 March	Doterel	Doterel-class sloop	Chatham Dockyard	Chatham	United Kingdom	For Royal Navy.
9 March	Lydia	Thames barge	Messrs. Bayley & Sons	Ipswich	United Kingdom	For Messrs. Brooks & Son.
9 March	Silvio	Steamship	Earle's Shipbuilding & Engineering Company (Limited)	Hull	United Kingdom	For Messrs. Thomas Wilson, Sons & Co.
10 March	Ajax	Ajax-class battleship	Pembroke Dockyard	Pembroke	United Kingdom	For Royal Navy.
10 March	Niger	Paddle gunboat	John Elder & Co.	Govan	United Kingdom	For Royal Navy.
10 March	Rio Branco	Paddle steamer	Messrs. Henry Murray & Co.	Greenock	United Kingdom	For National Brazilian Imperial Mail Steamship Company.
11 March	Bath City	Steamship	Messrs. Richardson, Duck & Co.	South Stockton-on-Tees	United Kingdom	For Messrs. Charles Hill & Sons.
12 March	Ravenna	Steamship	William Denny & Bros.	Dumbarton	United Kingdom	For Peninsular and Oriental Steam Navigation Company.
13 March	Benalla	Steamship	Messrs. W. H. Potter & Son	Liverpool	United Kingdom	For Joseph Hoult.
13 March	James Wilkie	Steamship	Messrs. Dobson & Charles	Grangemouth	United Kingdom	For P. & J. Wilkie.
13 March	Skyro	Steamship	James Laing	Sunderland	United Kingdom	For D. G. Pinkney & Son.
13 March	Tafna	Steamship	Messrs. Schlesinger, Davis & Co.	Wallsend	United Kingdom	For J. Mesnier.
13 March	Lily	Paddle steamer	Laird Bros.	Birkenhead	United Kingdom	For London and North Western Railway.
13 March	Thomas F. Bayard	Schooner	C. & R. Poillon	Brooklyn, New York	United States	For Delaware Pilots.
13 March	Zingri	Schooner		Fowey	United Kingdom	For Messrs. Sparrow.
15 March	Argo	Full-rigged ship	Messrs. Barclay, Curle & Co.	Whiteinch	United Kingdom	For Messrs. A. & J. H. Carmichael & Co.
15 March	Willie Glen	Schooner	Messrs. Barr & Shearer	Ardrossan	United Kingdom	For Messrs. Glen & Robertson.
19 March	Ravenna	Steamship	William Denny and Brothers	Dumbarton	United Kingdom	For Peninsular and Orental Steam Navigation Co. Ltd.
20 March	Stella Maris	Steamship	Forges et Chantiers de la Méditerranée	La Seyne	France	For Cie. Julien Cabissol
25 March	Charles Quint	Steamship	Messrs. A. & J. Inglis	Pointhouse	United Kingdom	For Compagnie Générale Transatlantique.
25 March	Helen Newton	Steamship	Robert Thompson & Sons	Sunderland	United Kingdom	For A. J. Newton.
25 March	Prins Hendrik	Paddle steamer	Messrs. John Elder & Co.	Govan	United Kingdom	For Stoomboot Maatschappij Zeeland.
25 March	Titania	Steamship	Messrs. Raylton Dixon & Co.	Middlesbrough	United Kingdom	For Messrs. C. T. Bowring & Co.
27 March	Bayard	Bayard-class battleship	Arsenal de Brest	Brest, France	France	For French Navy
27 March	Canton	Steamship	Messrs. Wigham, Richardson & Co.	Low Walker	United Kingdom	For private owners.
27 March	Peshwa	Cargo ship	Harland & Wolff	Belfast	United Kingdom	For Turner & Co.
27 March	Soto	Steamship	Messrs. Napier, Shanks, & Bell	Yoker	United Kingdom	For Messrs. J. Roca & Co.
27 March	Vanadis	Steam yacht	Messrs. Ramage & Ferguson	Leith	United Kingdom	For Messrs. J. A. Hankey & C. M'Iver.
27 March	Winnebah	Steamship	Harland & Wolff	Belfast	United Kingdom	For South African Steamship Company.
29 March	Brantford City	Steamship	Messrs. W. Gray & Co.	West Hartlepool	United Kingdom	For Messrs. T. Furness & Co.
29 March	Ivanhoe	Steamship	Messrs. H. M'Intyre & Co.	Paisley	United Kingdom	For Messrs. William M'Lachlan & Co.
29 March	Miramar	Steamship	Messrs Murdoch & Murray	Port Glasgow	United Kingdom	For Messrs. Raeburn & Virrel.
29 March	Vincenzio Florio	Steamship	Messrs. Alexander Stephen & Sons	Pointhouse	United Kingdom	For Messrs. I. & V. Florio & Co.
30 March	Elcano	Steamship	Messrs. A. M'Millan & Son	Dumbarton	United Kingdom	For Messrs. Olano Larrinaga & Co.
30 March	Harley	Collier	Messrs. Russell & Co.	Port Glasgow	United Kingdom	For Messrs. James Harley & Co.
30 March	Stranton	Steamship	Messrs. W. Gray & Co.	West Hartlepool	United Kingdom	For West Hartlepool Steam Navigation Company.
30 March	Vanduara	Cutter	Messrs. D. & W. Henderson & Co.	Partick	United Kingdom	For John Clark.
March	Duke of Buckingham	Steamship	Barrow Ship Building Co. Ltd.	Barrow-in-Furness	United Kingdom	For Eastern Steam Ship Co. Ltd.
March	Haydn	Steamship	Messrs. Joseph L. Thompson & Sons	Sunderland	United Kingdom	For Jenneson Taylor & Co.
March	Plucky	Tug	William Denny & Bros.	Dumbarton	United Kingdom	For Otago Towing Co.
March	Progress	Steamship	Messrs. Murdoch & Murray	Greenock	United Kingdom	For Great Northern Fish Carrying Company.
6 April	Diana	Barque	Messrs. Charles Connell & Co.	Scotstoun	United Kingdom	For Messrs. Barton & Co.
7 April	Dora	Steamship	Matthew Turner	San Francisco, California	United States	For Alaska Commercial Company.
8 April	Miramar	Paddle steamer	Messrs. John Reid & Co.	Port Glasgow	United Kingdom	For private owner.
9 April	Allan Macdonell	Steamship	Campbeltown Ship Building Co.	Campbeltown	United Kingdom	For Newry Salt Works Company.
10 April	Alverton	Steamship	Messrs. Edward Withy & Co.	Middleton	United Kingdom	For Messrs. Middleton & Co.
10 April	Asia	Steamship	Messrs. Earle's Shipbuilding and Engineering Co. (Limited)	Hull	United Kingdom	For Hull Steam Shipping & Ice Co. (Limited).
10 April	Europe	Steamship	Messrs. Earle's Shipbuilding and Engineering Co. (Limited)	Hull	United Kingdom	For Hull Steam Shipping & Ice Co. (Limited).
10 April	Mercader	Steam trawler	Messrs. D. Allan & Co.	Leith	United Kingdom	For Messrs. Mercader & Son.
10 April	Villa d'Oran	Steamship	Messrs. Wigham, Richardson & Co.	Low Walker	United Kingdom	For Compagnie Générale Transatlantique.
12 April	Möise	Steamship	Messrs. John Elder & Co.	Fairfield	United Kingdom	For Compagnie Générale Transatlantique.
13 April	Valencia	Steamship	Messrs. Blackwood & Gordon	Port Glasgow	United Kingdom	For Messrs. Moffat & Henderson.
21 April	Chancellor	Paddle steamer	Robert Chambers Jr.	Dumbarton	United Kingdom	For Lochlomond & Lochlong Steamboat Company.
21 April	Vigilant	Steamship	Messrs. Murdoch & Murray	Port Glasgow	United Kingdom	For Great Northern Fish Carrying Company.
22 April	Cyclops	Steamship	Messrs. Scott & Co.	Cartsdyke	United Kingdom	For Messrs. Alfred Holt & Co.
22 April	William Hartmann	Steamship	Messrs. Schlesinger, Davis & Co.	Wallsend	United Kingdom	For Messrs. Ward & Holzapfel.
24 April	Aline	Steam yacht	Messrs. Ramage & Ferguson	Leith	United Kingdom	For W. P. Walker.
24 April	Hispania	Steamship	D. & W. Henderson & Co.	Partick	United Kingdom	For Anchor Line.
24 April	Howards	Steamship	Osbourne, Graham & Co	Sunderland	United Kingdom	For J. F. Marshall.
24 April	Ranee	Steamship	Messrs. Dobson & Charles	Grangemouth	United Kingdom	For Joseph Tinn.
24 April	St. Gothard	Steamship	Messrs. Readhead & Co.	South Shields	United Kingdom	For Messrs. Hall, Cay & Co.
26 April	Akaba	Steamship	Messrs. M. Pearse & Co.	Stockton-on-Tees	United Kingdom	For private owner.
26 April	Freda	Yacht		Battersea	United Kingdom	For T. G. Freke.
26 April	Gondola	Steam yacht	Messrs. Camper & Nicholson	Gosport	United Kingdom	For Samuel Whitbread.
26 April	Lake Manitoba	Steamship	Messrs. James & George Thomson	Dalmuir	United Kingdom	For Canada Shipping Company (Limited).
26 April	Laleham	Steamship	Palmer's Shipbuilding and Iron Co.	Jarrow	United Kingdom	For Messrs. J. Temperley & Co.
26 April	Sierra Estrella	Full-rigged ship	Messrs. Richardson, Duck & Co.	South Stockton-on-Tees	United Kingdom	For Messrs. Thompson, Anderson & Co.
26 April	Tridente	Paddle steamer	Messrs. William Denny & Bros.	Dumbarton	United Kingdom	For Lloyd's Argentine de Navigacion á Vapor.
27 April	Avlona	Steamship	Messrs. Gourlay Bros.	Dundee	United Kingdom	For William Thomson.
27 April	Cherubini	Steamship	Short Bros.	Sunderland	United Kingdom	For J. Taylor & Co.
27 April	Goodwood	Barque	Messrs. John & William B. Harvey	Climping	United Kingdom	For A. W. Halden.
27 April	Rohilla	Steamship	Messrs. Caird & Co.	Greenock	United Kingdom	For Peninsular and Oriental Steam Navigation Company.
27 April	Ulloa	Steamship	Messrs. Napier, Shanks & Bell	Yoker	United Kingdom	For Messrs. R. Macandrew & Co.
27 April	Ville de Madrid	Steamship	Messrs. A. & J. Inglis	Partick	United Kingdom	For Compagnie Générale Transatlantique.
27 April	Unnamed	Steam hopper barge		Blyth	United Kingdom	For Russian Government.
28 April	Ardoe	Steamship	Messrs. Hall, Russell & Co.	Aberdeen	United Kingdom	For Messrs. Adam & Co.
28 April	Inchmaree	Steamship	Messrs. C. Mitchell & Co.	Low Walker	United Kingdom	For Messrs. Hamilton, Frazer & Co.
28 April	St. Augustin	Steamship	Messrs. John Elder & Co.	Govan	United Kingdom	For Compagnie Générale Transatlantique.
29 April	Adjutant	Steamship	Messrs. Barclay, Curle & Co.	Whiteinch	United Kingdom	For Bird Line.
1 May	Redland	Steamship	Campbeltown Shipbuilding Company	Campbeltown	United Kingdom	For Great Western Line.
1 May	Unnamed	Merchantman	Messrs. Scarr	Beverley	United Kingdom	For private owner.
5 May	White Head	Cargo ship	Harland & Wolff	Belfast	United Kingdom	For Ulster Steamship Co.
6 May	Drift	Yacht	Thomas Sandry	Porthleven	United Kingdom	For C. Clarke.
6 May	John Chagot	Steamship	Palmer's Shipbuilding Company	Jarrow	United Kingdom	For private owner.
7 May	Frolic	Yacht	James Adam	Gourock	United Kingdom	For William Adam.
8 May	Adelaide	Paddle steamer	Barrow Ship Building Company	Barrow-in-Furness	United Kingdom	For Great Eastern Railway.
8 May	Barnesmore	Steamship	Messrs. Thomas Royden & Sons.	Liverpool	United Kingdom	For Messrs. William Johnston & Co.
8 May	Elfie	Steamship	Messrs. William Gray & Co.	West Hartlepool	United Kingdom	For Messrs. Neilsen & Co.
8 May	Gulf of Suez	Steamship	Messrs. William Gray & Co.	West Hartlepool	United Kingdom	For Greenock Steamship Co.
8 May	Leo XIII	Schooner	William Morris	Skerries	United Kingdom	For private owner.
8 May	Malemba	Steamship	Messrs. John Elder & Co.	Govan	United Kingdom	For British and African Steam Navigation Company.
8 May	Ville de Bône	Steamship	Messrs. Wigham, Richardson & Co.	Low Walker	United Kingdom	For Compagnie Générale Transatlantique.
10 May	Albert Victor	Paddle steamer	Messrs. Samuda Bros.	Poplar	United Kingdom	For South Eastern Railway.
10 May	Pamiat Merkuria	Cruiser	Société Nouvelle des Forges et Chantiers de la Méditerranée	Toulon	France	For Imperial Russian Navy.
11 May	Marion	Steamship	Joseph L. Thompson & Sons	Sunderland	United Kingdom	For James Gray & Co.
11 May	Roxburgh Castle	Steamship	Bartram, Haswell & Co	Sunderland	United Kingdom	For Red Cross Line.
11 May	Tangier	Steamship	Messrs. Raylton Dixon & Co.	Middlesbrough	United Kingdom	For Messrs. Angier Bros.
12 May	Eira	Steam yacht	Messrs. Stephen & Forbes	Peterhead	United Kingdom	For B. Leigh Smith.
12 May	Garry	Steamship	W. B. Thompson	Dundee	United Kingdom	For Messrs. George Armitstead & Co.
17 May	Gladys	Steam yacht	Messrs. John Reid & Co.	Port Glasgow	United Kingdom	For Neil Mathieson.
22 May	Deerhound	Steamship	Messrs. C. Mitchell & Co.	Newcastle upon Tyne	United Kingdom	For Messrs. Robert Thomson & Co.
22 May	Garnet	Steamship	Messrs. Gourlay Bros. & Co.	Dundee	United Kingdom	For P. M. Duncan.
22 May	Redwing	Steamship		Pembroke Dockyard	United Kingdom	For Board of Customs.
22 May	Ville de Barcelona	Steamship	Messrs. Caird & Co.	Greenock	United Kingdom	For Compagnie Générale Transatlantique.
24 May	Draguet	Steamship	Messrs. Scott & Co.	Cartsdyke	United Kingdom	For Compagnie Générale Transatlantique.
24 May	Fairy	Trawling smack	Mr. M'Cann	Garrison Side	United Kingdom	For J. W. Hame.
24 May	Julia	Steamship	S. P. Austin & Son	Sunderland	United Kingdom	For A. C. de Freitas & Co.
24 May	Osmanli	Steamship	Messrs. C. Mitchell & Co	Low Walker	United Kingdom	For Messrs. James Moss & Co.
24 May	Tyrolese	Steamship	Robert Thompson Jr.	Southwick	United Kingdom	For Messrs. John Glynn & Son.
25 May	Menai	Steamship	Robert Foster	Sunderland	United Kingdom	For Arvon Shipping Co. Ltd.
25 May	Nielly	Lapérouse-class cruiser	Arsenal de Brest	Brest	France	For French Navy.
25 May	Sea Queen	Steam yacht	Messrs. Robert Duncan & Co.	Port Glasgow	United Kingdom	For Mr. Galbraith.
25 May	Sovereign	Schooner	Messrs. Carnegie & Mathew	Peterhead	United Kingdom	For George Stephen.
25 May	Speedwell	Steamship	Messrs. Murdoch & Murray	Port Glasgow	United Kingdom	For Great Northern Fish Carrying Co.
25 May	Woodstock	Steamship	Messrs. Ramage & Ferguson	Leith	United Kingdom	For Messrs. George Gibson & Co.
26 May	Abd-el-Kader	Steamship	Messrs. John Elder & Co.	Govan	United Kingdom	For Compagnie Générale Transatlantique.
26 May	Amy	Steam yacht	Messrs. Cunliffe & Dunlop	Port Glasgow	United Kingdom	For N. B. Stewart.
26 May	Chonila	Steam yacht	Messrs. Thomas Brassey & Sons	Birkenhead	United Kingdom	For Henry Pigeon.
26 May	Cynthia	Steamship	Messrs. David & William Henderson & Co.	Partick	United Kingdom	For Messrs. Donaldson Bros.
26 May	Flavian	Steamship	Palmer's Shipbuilding and Iron Co.	Jarrow	United Kingdom	For Messrs. Leyland & Co.
26 May	George Moore	Steamship	Messrs. William Hamilton & Co.	Port Glasgow	United Kingdom	For Messrs. John Melmore & Co.
26 May	Glen Etive	Steamship	Thomas B. Seath & Co.	Rutherglen	United Kingdom	For J. Murray.
26 May	Laomene	Clipper	Messrs. W. H. Potter & Son	Liverpool	United Kingdom	For Messrs. Henry Fernie & Sons.
26 May	Martha	Schooner	W. H. Tonkin	Cardiff	United Kingdom	For William Gibbs.
26 May	Premier	Steamship	Messrs. Raylton Dixon & Co.	Middlesbrough	United Kingdom	For Messrs. Edward Harris & Co.
26 May	Rossmore	Steamship	William Doxford & Sons	Sunderland	United Kingdom	For W. Johnston & Co.
26 May	Washington	Steamship	Messrs. Alexander Stephen & Sons	Linthouse	United Kingdom	For Messrs. J. & V. Florio & Co.
27 May	Adeline Schull	Steamship	Messrs. H. M'Intyre & Co.	Paisley	United Kingdom	For Messrs. Kallekhoff & Schoeller.
27 May	Earn	Barque	Messrs. James Mollison & Sons	Dundee	United Kingdom	For Messrs. Robertson Bros.
27 May	Fanny Crossfield	Schooner	Mr. Rodgers	Carrickfergus	United Kingdom	For Messrs. James Fisher & Sons.
27 May	Gitano	Steamship	Earle's Shipbuilding & Engineering Co.	Hull	United Kingdom	For Messrs. Wilson, Sons, & Co.
27 May	Greyhound	Steamship	Messrs. Robert Duncan & Co.	Port Glasgow	United Kingdom	For Messrs. Robert Thomson & Co.
27 May	New Minster	Steamship	Palmer's Shipbuilding and Iron Company	Jarrow	United Kingdom	For J. E. Bowser and partners.
27 May	Rosetta	Passenger ship	Harland & Wolff	Belfast	United Kingdom	For Peninsular and Orental Steam Navigation Co. Ltd.
27 May	Stanley	Storeship	Messrs. Robert Napier & Sons	Govan	United Kingdom	For Royal Navy.
27 May	Waterwitch	Yacht	Messrs. Camper & Nicholson	Gosport	United Kingdom	For E. C. Baring.
29 May	Courrier de Îles d'Hyères	Steamship	Messrs. D. Allan & Co.	Leith	United Kingdom	For French Government.
29 May	Clydach	Steamship	Osbourne, Graham & Co.	Sunderland	United Kingdom	For W. Perch.
29 May	Firth of Cromarty	Merchantman	Messrs. Russell & Co.	Port Glasgow	United Kingdom	For Messrs. Spencer & Co.
29 May	Leda	Steam yacht	Messrs. Murdoch & Murray	Port Glasgow	United Kingdom	For David Laidlaw.
May	Banshee	Steam yacht	H. Macintyre & Co.	Paisley	United Kingdom	For W. B. Forwood.
May	Redcastle	Ferryboat	H. Macintyre & Co.	Paisley	United Kingdom	For H. Steward.
May	Flora	Barge	Frederick Braby & Co. Ltd.	Deptford	United Kingdom	For private owner.
7 June	Boldana	Steamship	Messrs. William Denny & Bros.	Dumbarton	United Kingdom	For British India Steam Navigation Company (Limited).
7 June	Mustapha Ben Ismail	Steamship	Messrs. Scott & Co.	Cartsdyke	United Kingdom	For Compagnie Générale Transatlantique.
8 June	Girl of Devon	Schooner	W. H. Shilston	Coxside	United Kingdom	For W. H. Shilston.
8 June	Mooltan	Full-rigged ship	Messrs. Richardson, Duck & Co.	South Stockton-on-Tees	United Kingdom	For British and Eastern Shipping Company (Limited).
8 June	Pharos	Steamship	Messrs. Aitken & Mansel	Whiteinch	United Kingdom	For Messrs. James Moss & Co.
9 June	Constance	Comus-class corvette	Chatham Dockyard	Chatham	United Kingdom	For Royal Navy.
9 June	Ibex	Steamship	Messrs. Edward Withy & Co.	Middleton	United Kingdom	For Messrs. Cory, Lohden & Jacksons.
9 June	Westonia	Steam yacht	Fullarton & Co.	Paisley	United Kingdom	For W. C. Dawson.
10 June	Grand Duchess Olga	Steamship	Messrs. A. Leslie & Co.	Hebburn	United Kingdom	For Russian Steam Navigation and Trading Company.
10 June	Kaiser	Steamship	Messrs. W. Gray & Co.	West Hartlepool	United Kingdom	For West Hartlepool Steam Navigation Company.
10 June	Lennox	Steamship	Messrs. Alexander Stephen & Sons	Linthouse	United Kingdom	For Messrs. John Warrack & Co.
10 June	Parklands	Steamship	Messrs. W. Gray & Co.	West Hartlepool	United Kingdom	For Messrs. R. Ropner & Co.
11 June	Diolibah	Steamship	Messrs. A. M'Millan & Son	Dumbarton	United Kingdom	For M. C. A. Verminck.
12 June	Adria	Steamship	Messrs. Blackwood & Gordon	Port Glasgow	United Kingdom	For Adria Steam Shipping Co.
12 June	Bellerophon	Steamship	Messrs. Scott & Co.	Cartsdyke	United Kingdom	For Mr. Holt.
12 April	Euterpe	Yacht	D. Hatcher	Southampton	United Kingdom	For A. O. Bayly.
12 June	Isaac Péréire	Steamship	Messrs. John Elder & Co.	Fairfield	United Kingdom	For Compagnie Générale Transatlantique.
12 June	Red Rose	Steamship	Messrs. Schlesinger, Davis & Co.	Wallsend	United Kingdom	For Peter Rowe.
12 June	Southfield	Barque	Messrs. Russell & Co.	Port Glasgow	United Kingdom	For Renton & Co.
12 June	Warkworth Harbour	Steamship	Messrs. H. M'Intyre & Co.	Merksworth	United Kingdom	For H. Andrews.
18 June	Ellas	Steamship	Messrs. H. M'Intyre & Co.	Merksworth	United Kingdom	For Sr. D. Gudi.
19 June	Douro	Steamship	Messrs. Oswald, Mordaunt & Co.	Woolston	United Kingdom	For Messrs. Leyland & Co.
21 June	Fair Geraldine	Steam yacht	Messrs. Ramage & Ferguson	Leith	United Kingdom	For Otho Fitzgerald.
22 June	Lizzie English	Steamship	Messrs. Turnbull & Sons	Whitby	United Kingdom	For G. Pyman.
22 June	Pearl	Steamship	Messrs. William Hamilton & Co.	Port Glasgow	United Kingdom	For Messrs. James Hay & Sons.
22 June	Spey	Steamship	Messrs. Gourlay Bros.	Dundee	United Kingdom	For Messrs. George Armitstead & Co.
23 June	Alice Kate	Schooner	H. L. Read	Saundersfoot	United Kingdom	For Mr. Murphy.
23 June	Ben Or	Barquentine	William Pickard	Appledore	United Kingdom	For private owner.
23 June	Daring	Yacht	H. Harnden	Salcombe	United Kingdom	For F. R. Kennedy.
23 June	Leo	Steamship	Messrs. Finch & Co. (Limited)	Chepstow	United Kingdom	For Messrs. Styles & De Boisdeval.
23 June	Ogwen	Steamship	Robert Foster	Sunderland	United Kingdom	For Arvon Shipping Co. Ltd.
23 June	Triumph	Steamship	Raylton Dixon & Co.	Middlesbrough	United Kingdom	For McIntyre Bros., & Co.
24 June	Ardanbhan	Steamship	Messrs. Henry Murray & Co.	Port Glasgow	United Kingdom	For Messrs. M'Laren, Crum & Co.
24 June	Catarina	Steam yacht	Messrs. Robert Steele & Co.	Greenock	United Kingdom	For James Houldsworth.
24 June	Countess of Cromertie	Steamship	W. B. Thompson	Dundee	United Kingdom	For Messrs. James Allison & Son.
24 June	Foxhound	Steamship	Messrs. Robert Duncan & Co.	Port Glasgow	United Kingdom	For Messrs. Robert Thompson & Co.
24 June	Speedwell	Steamship	Messrs. Hodgson & Soulsby	Blyth	United Kingdom	For Messrs. Adler & Proctor, or Great Northern Fish Carrying Company.
25 June	Unnamed	Steam yacht	Messrs. Grendon & Co.	Drogheda	United Kingdom	For W. S. Cooper.
26 June	Camargo	Steamship	William Pickersgill	Sunderland	United Kingdom	For Messrs. Richard W. Jones & Co.
26 June	John Marychurch	Steamship	Joseph L. Thompson & Sons	Sunderland	United Kingdom	For John Marychurch & Co.
28 June	Kléber	Steamship	Messrs. Caird & Co.	Greenock	United Kingdom	For Compagnie Générale Transatlantique.
30 June	Wearmouth	Steamship	Short Bros	Sunderland	United Kingdom	For J. S. Barwick.
June	Agnes	Yawl			United Kingdom	For Henry Burney.
June	Countess of Cromartie	Steamship		Dundee	United Kingdom	For private owner.
June	Gallego	Steamship	Robert Thompson & Sons	Southwick	United Kingdom	For M. M. de Arrotegui.
June	Severn	Steam yacht	Barrow Shipbuilding Co.	Barrow-in-Furness	United Kingdom	For Earl of Ducie.
3 July	Firefly	Steamship	Messrs. R. & H. Green	Blackwall	United Kingdom	For Messrs. Pickford & Co.
3 July	Glowworm	Steamship	Messrs. R. & H. Green	Blackwall	United Kingdom	For Messrs. Pickford & Co.
5 July	Forest	Steamship	Palmer's Iron Shipbuilding Co.	Jarrow	United Kingdom	For Messrs. Moral Bros.
6 July	Carlo	Steamship	Messrs. Alexander Stephen & Sons	Linthouse	United Kingdom	For Messrs. Tellefsen, Wills & Co.
6 July	Jasper	Steamship	Messrs. T. B. Seath & Co.	Rutherglen	United Kingdom	For William Robertson.
7 July	Livadia	Imperial yacht	John Elder & Co.	Govan	United Kingdom	For Alexander III.
7 July	Seahorse	Admiralty tug	Laird Bros.	Birkenhead	United Kingdom	For Royal Navy.
8 July	Alexandre Bixio	Steamship	Messrs. M. Pearse & Co.	Stockton-on-Tees	United Kingdom	For private owner.
8 July	Alton Ower	Steamship	Messrs. A. Leslie & Co.	Hebburn	United Kingdom	For Messrs. Adams & Co.
8 July	Coot	Cutter	Henry Harnden	Salcomber	United Kingdom	For J. F. Froude.
8 July	Envoy	Steamship	Messrs. Raylton Dixon & Co.	Middlesbrough	United Kingdom	For Messrs. Edward Harris & Co.
9 July	Unnamed	Tug	Messrs. Wouldhave & Johnstone	North Shields	United Kingdom	For Mr. Marshall.
10 July	Blackhalls	Steamship	Messrs. W. Gray & Co.	West Hartlepool	United Kingdom	For Mr. Ropner.
10 July	Leda	Steamship	Stabilimento Tecnico Triestino	Trieste	Austria-Hungary	For Österreichischer Lloyd.
10 July	Lucinda	Steamship	Messrs. W. Gray & Co.	West Hartlepool	United Kingdom	For F. Herskind.
10 July	Orsino	Steamship	Robert Thompson & Sons	Sunderland	United Kingdom	For H. Roberts & Son.
10 July	Southwood	Steamship	Messrs. Richardson, Duck & Co.	South Stockton-on-Tees	United Kingdom	For David Wilson.
12 July	Steel Arrow	Steamship	Messrs. Dobie & Co.	Govan	United Kingdom	For private owner.
13 July	Flying Dutchman	Paddle tug	J. T. Eltringham	South Shields	United Kingdom	For Clyde Shipping Company.
14 July	City of Brussels	Steamship	Robert Chambers Jr.	Dumbarton	United Kingdom	For Messrs. Thomas & Co.
14 July	North Durham	Steamship	Palmer's Shipbuilding and Iron Company	Jarrow	United Kingdom	For Messrs. Hugh Roberts & Son.
17 July	Booria	Gunboat		Saint Petersburg	Russia	For Imperial Russian Navy.
17 July	Groza	Gunboat		Saint Petersburg	Russia	For Imperial Russian Navy.
17 July	Unnamed	Steamship	G. Nurse	Hotwells	United Kingdom	For G. Nurse.
20 July	Mutine	Doterel-class sloop		Devonport Dockyard	United Kingdom	For Royal Navy.
21 July	Duchess of Edinburgh	Paddle steamer	J. & G. Thompson	Clydebank	United Kingdom	For South Eastern Railway.
22 July	Alicia	Steamship	Messrs. Edward Withy & Co.	Middleton	United Kingdom	For Messrs. Middleton & Co.
22 July	Berry Castle	Steamship	Messrs Polyblank & Co.	Kingswear	United Kingdom	For Dartmouth & Torbay Steam Packet Co.
22 July	Liscard	Steamship	Messrs. T. & W. Smith	North Shields	United Kingdom	For Messrs. Arthur Holland & Co.
23 July	Cholmley	Steamship	Messrs. Turnbull & Co.	Whitby	United Kingdom	For Messrs. Turnbull, Sons, & Co.
23 July	Duchess of Edinburgh	Paddle steamer	Messrs. J. & George Thompson	Clydebank	United Kingdom	For South Eastern Railway.
23 July	Konoowarra	Steamship	Messrs. Russell & Co.	Greenock	United Kingdom	For Messrs. Carson & M'Ilwraith.
23 July	Snowdrop	Fishing vessel	Messrs. Capps & Crips	Lowestoft	United Kingdom	For T. E. Thirtle.
24 July	Antisana	Steamship	Messrs. R. & J. Evans & Co.	Birkenhead	United Kingdom	For Messrs. George Bell & Co.
24 July	City of Liverpool	Steamship	Messrs. Richardson, Duck & Co.	South Stockton-on-Tees	United Kingdom	For Messrs. W. H. Ross & Co.
24 July	Excellent	Steamship	Short Bros	Sunderland	United Kingdom	For Messrs. Anderson, Horan & Co.
24 July	Finsbury	Steamship	Messrs. C. S. Swan & Hunter	Wallsend-on-Tyne	United Kingdom	For Messrs. Watts, Ward & Co.
24 July	Louise Dagmar	Steamship	Messrs. Samuda Bros.	Poplar	United Kingdom	For South Eastern Railway.
24 July	Mayo	Paddle steamer	Messrs. Laird Bros.	Birkenhead	United Kingdom	For City of Dublin Steam Packet Company.
24 July	Manoubia	Steamship	Forges et Chantiers de la Méditerranée.	Le Havre	France	For Cie. Générale Transatlantique
24 July	Titania	Steamship	Messrs. David & William Henderson	Partick	United Kingdom	For Messrs. Donaldson Bros.
24 July	Unnamed	Steamship	J. T. Eltringham	South Shields	United Kingdom	For Messrs. Humble & Thompson.
26 July	Irthington	Steamship	Osbourne, Graham & Co.	Sunderland	United Kingdom	For J. D. Milburn.
27 July	Lady of the Isles	Steam yacht	Messrs. John Reid & Co.	Port Glasgow	United Kingdom	For Lord Macdonald.
28 July	Baden	Sachsen-class ironclad	Kaiserliche Werft	Kiel	Germany	For Kaiserliche Marine.
28 July	Gooddy	Steamship	Messrs. H. M'Intyre & Co	Merksworth	United Kingdom	For Sr. Eligis Giacopini.
29 July	Opritchnik	Clipper	Baltic Works	Saint Petersburg	Russia	For Imperial Russian Navy.
July	Fame	Ketch	Messrs. Richard Hill & Son	Plymouth	United Kingdom	For private owner.
July	George Stetson	Schooner	Albert Hathorn	Bath, Maine	United States	For Parker M. Whitmore.
3 August	La Valletta	Steamship	Messrs. Scott & Co.	Cartsdyke	United Kingdom	For Compagnie Générale Transatlantique.
4 August	Auchintoul	Steamship	Messrs. Hall, Russell & Co.	Aberdeen	United Kingdom	For Messrs. Adam & Co.
4 August	Earl of Rosebury	Steamship	Messrs. Alexander Stephen & Sons	Linthouse	United Kingdom	For Messrs. Martin & Marquand.
4 August	Espiegle	Doterel-class sloop		Devonport Dockyard	United Kingdom	For Royal Navy.
4 August	Ferrara	Steamship	Messrs. Robert Steele & Co.	Greenock	United Kingdom	For Leith, Hull and Hamburg Shipping Co.
4 August	San Fernando	Steamship	Robert Thompson & Sons	Sunderland	United Kingdom	For Messrs. Stephenson, Clarke & Co.
5 August	Kenmore	Steamship	W. B. Thompson	Dundee	United Kingdom	For James Millar.
6 August	Mandalay	Barque	Messrs. Russell & Co.	Greenock	United Kingdom	For Messrs. W. & J. Crawford & Co.
7 August	Countess of Durham	Steam launch	Robert Collier	Monkwearmouth	United Kingdom	For private owner.
7 August	Dallam Tower	Steamship	Messrs. M. Pearse & Co.	Stockton-on-Tees	United Kingdom	For Messrs. Stumore, Weston & Co.
7 August	George Stanton	Tug	Messrs. Laird Bros.	Birkenhead	United Kingdom	For Shropshire Union Railways and Canal Company.
7 August	Grimsel	Steamship	Messrs. John Readhead & Sons	South Shields	United Kingdom	For Messrs. Cay. Hall & Co.
7 August	Sandal	Steamship	Messrs. W. Gray & Co.	West Hartlepool	United Kingdom	For Messrs. J. Merryweather & Co.
9 August	Bhundara	Steamship	Messrs. William Denny & Bros.	Dumbarton	United Kingdom	For British India Steam Navigation Company (Limited).
9 August	Star	Schooner	James Petrie	Montrose	United Kingdom	For private owner.
9 August	Yosemite	Steam yacht	Delaware River Iron Ship Building and Engine Works	Chester, Pennsylvania	United States	For William Belden.
10 August	Cadoxton	Steamship	Messrs. Schlesinger, Davis & Co.	Wallsend	United Kingdom	For Matthew Cope and others.
10 August	Magon	Villars-class cruiser	Arsenal de Cherbourg	Cherbourg	France	For French Navy.
10 August	Miss Williams	Schooner	Messrs. Rees, Jones & Son	Port Dinorwic	United Kingdom	For Williams & Co.
10 August	Simoom	Steamship	Messrs. C. Mitchell & Co.	Low Walker	United Kingdom	For Bedouin Steam Navigation Co.
10 August	Assyrian Monarch	Steamship	Earle's Shipbuilding Co.	Hull	United Kingdom	For Royal Exchange Shipping Co.
11 August	Tsukushi	Tsukushi-class cruiser	Armstrong	Newcastle upon Tyne	United Kingdom	For Imperial Japanese Navy.
12 August	Otter	Tender	Messrs. Blackwood & Gordon	Port Glasgow	United Kingdom	For Cunard Company (Limited).
18 August	Langrigg Hall	Barque	William Doxford & Sons	Sunderland	United Kingdom	For Herron, Dunn and Co.
19 August	Hoihow	Steamship	Messrs. Scott & Co.	Cartsdyke	United Kingdom	For Messrs. John Swire & Sons.
19 August	Limpopo	Steamship	Tyne Shipbuilding Company (Limited)	Willington Quay	United Kingdom	For W. Gray.
20 August	Ethel	Steamship	Messrs. Workman, Clark & Co.	Belfast	United Kingdom	For Messrs. M'Mullan & Gault.
21 August	Alene	Steamship	Messrs. Aitken & Mansel	Whiteinch	United Kingdom	For Atlas Steamship Co.
21 August	Bernard Hall	Steamship	James Laing	Deptford	United Kingdom	For West India and Pacific Steamship Co. Ltd.
21 August	Craigmore	Steamship	Barrow Ship Building Co. Ltd.	Barrow-in-Furness	United Kingdom	For Steamship Craigmore Ltd.
21 August	Cyanus	Steamship	Messrs. Edward Withy & Co.	Middleton	United Kingdom	For Messrs. Steel, Young & Co.
21 August	Hampshire	Steamship	William Doxford & Sons	Sunderland	United Kingdom	For George Marshall & Sons.
21 August	Khyber	East Indiaman	Messrs. W. H. Potter & Son	Liverpool	United Kingdom	For Messrs. T. & J. Brocklebank.
21 August	Mazaruni	Steamship	Messrs. Edward Withy & Co.	Middletonh	United Kingdom	For Messrs. Steel, Young & Co.
21 August	Otway Tower	Steamship	Messrs. Wigham, Richardson & Son	Low Walker-on-Tyne	United Kingdom	For Messrs. Stumore, Weston & Co.
23 August	Dunbeath Castle	Steamship	Campbeltown Shipbuilding Co.	Campbeltonw	United Kingdom	For Messrs. J. Henderson & Co.
23 August	Franklin	Steamship	Messrs. David & William Henderson & Co.	Partick	United Kingdom	For Spencers Gulf Steamship Company.
23 August	Ingerid	Steamship	Messrs. Raylton Dixon & Co.	Middlesbrough	United Kingdom	For Messrs. D. Burger & Sons.
23 August	Olderfleet	Steamship	Messrs. T. B. Seath & Co.	Rutherglen	United Kingdom	For Hugh Smylie.
23 August	Ottawa	Steamship	Messrs. Charles Connell & Co.	Scotstoun	United Kingdom	For Mississippi and Dominion Steamship Company (Limited).
23 August	Petrel	Steam lighter	Messrs. Barclay, Curle & Co.	Whiteinch	United Kingdom	For Glasgow and Greenock Shipping Company.
23 August	Reibndeer	Steamship	Messrs. W. Gray & Co.	West Hartlepool	United Kingdom	For private owner.
25 August	British Merchant	Sailing ship	Harland & Wolff	Belfast	United Kingdom	For British Shipowners Ltd.
25 August	Ellida	1-class gunboat	Karljohansvern	Horten	Norway	For Royal Norwegian Navy.
26 August	Theresinense	Paddle tug	Messrs. Laird Bros.	Birkenhead	United Kingdom	For private owner.
28 August	Henry Chisholm	Steamship	Thomas Quayle & Sons	Cleveland, Ohio	United States	For Alva Bradley.
August	United Kingdom	W. Allsup & Sons	Preston	Bebington	Ferry	For Birkenhead Corporation.
August	Garland	Steam yacht	Robert Chalmers	Dumbarton	United Kingdom	For J. W. Woodall.
August	J. S. Seaverns	Steamship	James Elliot	Saugatuck, Michigan	United States	For private owner.
August	Snow Flake	Schooner	Brundrit & Co.	Runcorn	United Kingdom	For James Foulkes & Co. Ltd.
2 September	Livonia	Steamship	Messrs. Aitken & Mansel	Whiteinch	United Kingdom	For James Cormack.
3 September	Diana	Paddle steamer	Messrs. William Denny & Bros.	Dumbarton	United Kingdom	For Lloyd's Argentine de Navigation á Vapor Coy.
3 September	Propitious	Steamship	Short Bros.	Sunderland	United Kingdom	For Messrs. Taylor & Sanderson.
3 September	Sea Queen	Steamship	Messrs. D. Allan & Co.	Leith	United Kingdom	For private owner.
4 September	Defiance	Humber keel	Joseph Burton	Selby	United Kingdom	For John Green.
4 September	Hilda	Steamship	Messrs. W. Gray & Co.	West Hartlepool	United Kingdom	For Messrs. F. Herskind & Co.
4 September	James Grice	Steamship	James Laing	Sunderland	United Kingdom	For Jones Bros. & Co.
4 September	Lyra	Steam lighter	Messrs. J. & J. Hay	Kirkintilloch	United Kingdom	For Messrs. J. & J. Hay.
6 September	Blair Athol	Steamship	Messrs. Cunliffe & Dunlop	Port Glasgow	United Kingdom	For Messrs. William Johnston & Co.
6 September	Keroula	Steamship	S. P. Austin & Son	Sunderland	United Kingdom	For Messrs. Porteous & Senier.
6 September	State of Nebraska	Steamship	London and Glasgow Engineering and Iron Shipbuilding Company	Govan	United Kingdom	For States Line.
6 September	Swordsman	Steamship	Messrs. T. & W. Smith	North Shields	United Kingdom	For Messrs. W. J. Jobling & Co.
7 September	Deak	Steamship	Messrs. Blackwood & Gordon	Greenock	United Kingdom	For Adria Steam Shipping Co.
7 September	Filipino	Steamship	Robert Chambers Jr.	Dumbarton	United Kingdom	For Messrs. Olano, Larrinaga & Co.
7 September	Fournel	Steamship	Messrs. A. & J. Inglis	Pointhouse	United Kingdom	For Compagnie Générale Transatlantique.
7 September	Landore	Steamship	Messrs. Schlesinger, Davis & Co.	Wallsend	United Kingdom	For Messrs. Poingdestre & Mesnier.
8 September	Benalder	Steamship	Messrs. Alexander Stephen & Sons	Linthouse	United Kingdom	For Ben Line.
8 September	Persian Monarch	Steamship	Messrs. Archibald M'Millan & Son	Dumbarton	United Kingdom	For Royal Exchange Shipping Co., and J. Paton Jr., & Co.
10 September	Newnham	Steamship	Palmers Shipbuilding and Iron Company	Newcastle upon Tyne	United Kingdom	For J. Temperley & Co.
16 September	Amity	Steamship	Robert Thompson Jr.	Southwick	United Kingdom	For Robert H. Gayner.
16 September	Borodino	Steamship	Earle's Shipbuilding and Engineering Company (Limited)	Hull	United Kingdom	For Messrs. Thomas Wilson, Sons & Co.
17 September	Lymington	Sailing barge	Mr. Vaux	Harwich	United Kingdom	For Mr. Vaux.
18 September	Flaminian	Steamship	Palmer's Shipbuilding and Iron Company (Limited)	Jarrow	United Kingdom	For Messrs. Leyland & Co.
18 September	Oaklands	Steamship	Messrs. William Gray & Co.	West Hartlepool	United Kingdom	For Messrs. Hardy, Wilson & Co.
18 September	Solon	Steamship	Messrs Turnbull & Sons	Whitby	United Kingdom	For Messrs. Robinson & Rowland.
20 September	Esparto	Steamship	Messrs. S. & H. Morton & Co.	Leith	United Kingdom	For London and Edinburgh Shipping Co.
20 September	Laura Emma	Schooner	Messrs. John Cowl & Sons	Padstow	United Kingdom	For William Philip & Co.
20 September	Limosa	Steamship	Messrs. M. Pearse & Co.	Stockton-on-Tees	United Kingdom	For Messrs. Porteous & Senier.
20 September	Pakhoi	Steamship	Messrs. Scott & Co.	Cartsdyke	United Kingdom	For Messrs. John Swire & Sons.
20 September	The Pearl	Schooner	W. Thomas	Amlwch	United Kingdom	For Fanning Evans.
20 September	Thracian	Steamship	Messrs. Murdoch & Murray	Port Glasgow	United Kingdom	For Messrs. J. & J. McFarlane.
20 September	Ville de Cette	Steamship	Messrs. Hodgson & Soulsby	Blyth	United Kingdom	For private owner.
20 September	Vivienne	Steamship	Messrs. Richardson, Duck & Co.	South Stockton-on-Tees	United Kingdom	For John Cuthbert.
21 September	Loch Rannoch	Steamship	Messrs. Gourlay Bros.	Dujdee	United Kingdom	For Loch Line.
21 September	Pearl	Schooner	William Thomas	Amlwch	United Kingdom	For Mr. Evans and others.
21 September	Wigtownshire	Barque	Messrs. Russell & Co.	Port Glasgow	United Kingdom	For Messrs. Thomas Law & Co.
22 September	Benefactor	Steamship	Messrs. W. H. Potter & Son	Liverpool	United Kingdom	For Joseph Hoult.
22 September	De Ruyter	Atjeh-class cruiser	Rijkswerf	Amsterdam	Netherlands	For Royal Netherlands Navy.
22 September	Emmy Haase	Steamship	Joseph L. Thompson & Sons	Sunderland	United Kingdom	For Messrs. Johnassos & Wiener.
22 September	La Barrouere	Steamship	Palmer's Shipbuilding and Iron Company	Jarrow	United Kingdom	For private owner.
22 September	Lochaber	Steamship	Messrs. Dobson & Charles	Grangemouth	United Kingdom	For William Craig Sim.
22 September	Volo	Steamship	Messrs. Robert Duncan & Co.	Port Glasgow	United Kingdom	For Messrs. Strong, Reid & Page.
23 September	Alverton	Steamship	Messrs. Aleander Stephen & Sons	Linthouse	United Kingdom	For Messrs. Osborn & Wallis.
23 September	Bellini	Steamship	Short Bros.	Pallion	United Kingdom	For James Taylor, or Jennesen, Taylor & Co.
23 September	Espiegle	Doterel-class sloop		Devonport Dockyard	United Kingdom	For Royal Navy.
24 September	Bittern	Steamship	Messrs. H. M'Intyre & Co.	Paisley	United Kingdom	For Cork Steamship Company.
24 September	Falernian	Steamship	Oswald, Mordaunt & Co.	Southampton	United Kingdom	For Messrs. Frederick Leyland & Co.
29 September	Italia	Italia-class ironclad		Castellammare di Stabia	Italy	For Regia Marina.
30 September	Tordenskjold	Ironclad	Orlogsværftet	Copenhagen	Denmark	For Royal Danish Navy.
September	Cetonia	Yacht	Messrs. Camper & Nicholson	Gosport	United Kingdom	For private owner.
September	Harrier	Yacht	Messrs. Camper & Nicholson	Gosport	United Kingdom	For private owner.
September	Kriemhilda	Yacht	Messrs. Camper & Nicholson	Gosport	United Kingdom	For private owner.
September	Maxima	Steamship	William Doxford & Sons	Sunderland	United Kingdom	For Peninsular and Oriental Steam Navigation Company.
September	Rosalie	Yacht	Messrs. Camper & Nicholson	Gosport	United Kingdom	For private owner.
2 October	Ascanius	Steamship	Messrs. Cochran & Co.	Birkenhead	United Kingdom	For Ocean Steamship Company.
2 October	Redbrook	Steamship	Palmer's Shipbuilding and Iron Company	Jarrow	United Kingdom	For Messrs. John Cory & Son.
3 October	Yesso	Steamship	James Laing	Sunderland	United Kingdom	For D. G. Pinkney & Sons.
4 October	Parkmore	Steamship	Messrs. MacIlwaine & Lewis	Belfast	United Kingdom	For private owner.
4 October	Seaham Harbour	Steamship	Messrs. Edward Withy & Co.	Middleton	United Kingdom	For Marquess of Londonderry.
5 October	Express	Tender	Messrs. D. & W. Henderson & Co.	Partick	United Kingdom	For Henderson Bros.
5 October	Janet M'Neil	Barque	Messrs. Russell & Co	Port Glasgow	United Kingdom	For Messrs. Brown & Watson.
5 October	Marana	Steamship	Messrs. Aitken & Mansel	Whiteinch	United Kingdom	For Messrs. George Bell & Co.
5 October	Unnamed	Tug	Messrs. R. & H. Green	Blackwall	United Kingdom	For Crown Agents for the Colonies.
6 October	Almirante Brown	Central-battery ironclad	Samuda Brothers	Poplar	United Kingdom	For Argentine Navy.
6 October	Bien Hoa	Bien-Hoa-class hospital transport	Forges et Chantiers de la Méditerranée	Le Havre	France	For French Navy
6 October	Castellano	Steamship	Robert Chambers Jr.	Dumbarton	United Kingdom	For Messrs. Olano, Larrinaga & Co.
6 October	Delcomyn	Steamship	Messrs. Wigham, Richardson & Co.	Newcastle upon Tyne	United Kingdom	For William Lund.
6 October	Grappler	Banterer-class gunboat	Barrow Ship Building Co. Ltd.	Barrow-in-Furness	United Kingdom	For Royal Navy.
6 October	Kerbella	Steamship	Messrs. William Denny & Bros.	Dumbarton	United Kingdom	For British India Steam Navigation Company (Limited).
6 October	Wasp	Banterer-class gunboat	Barrow Shipbuilding Company	Barrow-in-Furness	United Kingdom	For Royal Navy.
6 October	Wrangler	Banterer-class gunboat	Barrow Ship Building Co. Ltd.	Barrow-in-Furness	United Kingdom	For Royal Navy.
6 October	Ybarra No. 3	Steamship	Messrs. Raylton Dixon & Co.	Middlesbrough	United Kingdom	For Messrs. Ybarra, Hermanos & Co.
6 October	Unnamed	Dredger	T. Scott	Goole	United Kingdom	For Manchester, Sheffield and Lincolnshire Railway.
7 October	Leon XIII	Steamship	Messrs. John Elder & Co.	Fairfield	United Kingdom	For Marquess de Campo.
7 October	Pride of the West	Schooner	Charles Rawle	Padstow	United Kingdom	For private owner.
16 October	Tonnant	Coast defence ironclad	Arsenal de Rochefort	Rochefort	France	For French Navy
16 October	Teddington	Steamship	Messrs. C. S. Swan & Hunter	Newcastle upon Tyne	United Kingdom	For Messrs. W. Milburn & Co.
18 October	Maipu	Paddle torpedo boat	Messrs. John Elder & Co.	Fairfield	United Kingdom	For Argentine Navy.
18 October	Spark	Steamship	Robert Thompson & Sons	Southwick	United Kingdom	For John W. Smith.
19 October	Furnessia	Steamship	Barrow Ship Building Co. Ltd.	Barrow-in-Furness	United Kingdom	For Anchor Line.
19 October	Gulf of Finland	Steamship	Messrs. William Gray & Co.	West Hartlepool	United Kingdom	For Greenock Steamship Company.
19 October	Julia	Steam lighter	Messrs. Irvine & Co.	West Hartlepool	United Kingdom	For E. D. le Pouteur.
20 October	Phasis	Merchantman	Messrs. Barclay, Curle & Co.	Whiteinch	United Kingdom	For Messrs. A. & J. H. Carmichael.
20 October	Sapphire	Steamship	Messrs. Richardson, Duck & Co.	South Stockton	United Kingdom	For Messrs. C. O. Young & Christie.
20 October	William Hinde	Collier	Messrs. Workman, Clarke & Co.	Belfast	United Kingdom	For William Hinde.
21 October	Buckhurst	Merchantman	Messrs. Archibald M'Millan & Son	Dumbarton	United Kingdom	For Messrs. W. R. Price & Co.
21 October	Claudius	Steamship	Joseph L. Thompson & Sons	Sunderland	United Kingdom	For Thomas Kish.
21 October	Renfrew	Steamship	Palmer's Shipbuilding and Iron Company	Jarrow	United Kingdom	For Caledonia Steam Shipping Company.
22 October	Ballochbuie	Steamship	Messrs. Hall, Russell & Co.	Footdee	United Kingdom	For Messrs. J. & A. Davidson.
22 October	Cambrian	Steamship	Messrs. John Fullarton & Co.	Merksworth	United Kingdom	For Messrs. J. & J. Macfarlane.
23 October	Ennismore	Steamship	Barrow Ship Building Co. Ltd.	Barrow-in-Furness	United Kingdom	For Steamship Ennismore Ltd.
23 October	Keelung	Steamship	Messrs. Scott & Co.	Cartsdyke	United Kingdom	For Messrs. John Swire & Sons.
23 October	Valencia	Steamship	Messrs. Henry Murray & Co.	Kingston	United Kingdom	For Messrs. Goodyear & Co.
25 October	America	Schooner			United States	For New York Pilots.
1 November	Glendevon	Steamship	Palmer's Shipbuilding and Iron Co.	Jarrow	United Kingdom	For Messrs. Lindsay, Gracie & Co.
2 November	Banterer	Banterer-class gunboat	Barrow Shipbuilding Company	Barrow-in-Furness	United Kingdom	For Royal Navy.
2 November	Espoir	Banterer-class gunboat	Barrow Ship Building Co. Ltd.	Barrow-in-Furness	United Kingdom	For Royal Navy.
2 November	Scotsman	Steamship	Messrs. Edward Withy & Co.	Middleton	United Kingdom	For Messrs. Hugh Black & Co.
3 November	Katara	Paddle steamer	Messrs. Smith, Forrester & Co.	Kangaroo Point	Queensland	For Messrs. D. L. Brown & Co.
3 November	Ponca	Steamship	Messrs. Alexander Hall & Co.	Footdee	United Kingdom	For Messrs. Phelps, Bros., & Co.
4 November	British Queen	Passenger ship	Harland & Wolff	Belfast	United Kingdom	For British Shipowners Ltd.
4 November	Katie	Steamship	Messrs. Alexander Stephen & Sons	Govan	United Kingdom	For C. H. S. Schultz.
4 November	Montgomeryshire	Steamship	Messrs. Raylton Dixon & Co.	Middlesbrough	United Kingdom	For David James Jenkins.
4 November	Parisian	Steamship	Messrs. Napier & Sons	Glasgow	United Kingdom	For Allan Line.
4 November	Pembroke	Paddle steamer	Messrs. Laird	Birkenhead	United Kingdom	For Great Western Railway.
4 November	Redstart	Steamship	Messrs. M. Pearse & Co	Stockton-on-Tees	United Kingdom	For General Steam Navigation Company.
6 November	Algerine	Algerine-class gunvessel	Harland & Wolff	Belfast	United Kingdom	For Royal Navy.
6 November	Benedict	Steamship	Messrs. W. H. Potter & Son	Liverpool	United Kingdom	For Joseph Hoult.
6 November	Hartington	Steamship	Messrs. W. Gray & Co.	West Hartlepool	United Kingdom	For T. S. Hudson.
6 November	Romano	Steamship	Messrs. Earle & Co.	Hull	United Kingdom	For Messrs. Thomas Wilson, Sons, & Co.
6 November	Sikh	Steamship	Messrs. Aitken & Mansel	Whiteinch	United Kingdom	For Messrs. Gellatly, Hankey, Sewell & Co.
8 November	Tsukushi	Gunboat	Armstrong Whitworth	Newcastle upon Tyne	United Kingdom	For Imperial Japanese Navy.
11 November	Chaoyong	Tsukushi-class cruiser	Charles Mitchell & Co.	Newcastle upon Tyne	United Kingdom	For Imperial Chinese Navy.
13 November	Stamford	Steamship	Messrs. J. L. Thompson & Son	Sunderland	United Kingdom	For Thompson & Wrightson.
16 November	Bowesfield	Steamship	Messrs. Richardson, Duck & Co.	South Stockton-on-Tees	United Kingdom	For Messrs. F. Binnington & Co.
16 November	Camorta	Steamship	A. & J. Inglis	Pointhouse	United Kingdom	For Grey, Dawes & Co.
16 November	Gulf of Panama	Steamship	Messrs. Wigham, Richardson & Co.	Low Walker-on-Tyne	United Kingdom	For Greenock Steamship Company (Limited).
17 November	Cyprianao	Steamship	Messrs. Schlesinger, Davis & Co	Wallsend	United Kingdom	For La Société Française de Steamers.
17 November	Dowlais	Steamship	Messrs. Palmer's Shipbuilding and Iron Co.	Jarrow	United Kingdom	For Messrs. Mosel Bros. & Co.
17 November	Ganges	Steamship	Messrs. Gourlay Bros. & Co	Dundee	United Kingdom	For Messrs. David Bruce & Co.
17 November	Lufra	Steamship	Messrs. William Gray & Co.	West Hartlepool	United Kingdom	For Messrs. Ropner & Co.
17 November	Yoxford	Steamship	Tyne Iron Shipbuilding Co.	Willington Quay	United Kingdom	For Messrs. Hunting & Pattison.
18 November	Cataluna	Steamship	Messrs. Hodgson & Soulsby	Blyth	United Kingdom	For private owner.
18 November	Stuart	Steamship	William Pickersgill & Sons	Sunderland	United Kingdom	For John Bacon.
18 November	Tamsui	Steamship	Messrs. Scott & Co.	Cartsdyke	United Kingdom	For Messrs. John Swire & Sons.
19 November	Activ	Steamship	Robert Chalmers Jr.	Greenock	United Kingdom	For Carl Hassager.
19 November	Bancoora	troopship	Messrs. William Denny & Bros.	Dumbarton	United Kingdom	For British India Steam Navigation Company (Limited).
19 November	Bessie Morris	Steamship	Messrs. William Hamilton & Co.	Port Glasgow	United Kingdom	For Morris Line. Ran into the schooner Maria on being launched.
19 November	Florence	Steamship	Drogheda Iron Works	Drogheda	United Kingdom	For Waterford and Limerick Railway.
19 November	Kathleen	Steamship	Messrs. R. Irvine & Co.	West Hartlepool	United Kingdom	For private owner.
20 November	Elfrida	Steamship	Messrs. Campbell & Co.	Paisley	United Kingdom	For Messrs. A. C. Colvil & Co.
20 November	Glen Fruin	Steamship	London and Glasgow Iron Shipbuilding and Engineering Co.	Govan	United Kingdom	For Glen Line.
20 November	Kamchatka	Steamship	Messrs. Lobnitz & Co	Renfrew	United Kingdom	For Alexander E. Phillipus.
23 November	Santarem	Steamship	Messrs. Blackwood & Gordon	Port Glasgow	United Kingdom	For Amazon Steam Navigation Company.
24 November	Berwickshire	Barque	Messrs. Russell & Co.	Greenock	United Kingdom	For Messrs. T. Law & Son.
27 November	Carola	Carola-class corvette	AG Vulcan	Stettin	Germany	For Kaiserliche Marine.
30 November	Blodwen	Steamship	Sunderland Shipbuilding Company Ltd.	Sunderland	United Kingdom	For Arvon Shipping Co. Ltd.
November	Allowrie	Steamship	Messrs. Napier, Shanks & Bell and Messrs Rankin & Blackmore	Yoker and Greenock	United Kingdom	For Illawarra Steam Navigation Company.
November	Cotherstone	Steamship	Short Bros.	Sunderland	United Kingdom	For J. S. Barwick.
November	Emily Reed	Down Easter	A. R. Reed	Waldoboro, Maine	United States	For Yates & Porterfield.
1 December	Advance	Steamship	Messrs. Robert Duncan & Co.	Port Glasgow	United Kingdom	For Messrs. Thomson & Co.
1 December	Charles Attwood	Ferry	Tyne General Ferry Co.	Newcastle upon Tyne	United Kingdom	For Tyne General Ferry Co.
1 December	Fiume	Steamship	Messrs. H. M'Intyre & Co.	Merksworth	United Kingdom	For Messrs. Burrell & Co.
1 December	Granville	Steamship	Messrs. Raylton Dixon & Co.	Middlesbrough	United Kingdom	For Henry Pease.
2 December	Accretive	Steamship	Messrs. S. P. Austin & Son	Sunderland	United Kingdom	For Messrs. Coatsworth, Stockdale & Co.
2 December	Hardwick	Steamship	Messrs. Edward Withy & Co.	Middleton	United Kingdom	For Messrs. T. Richardson & Sons.
2 December	Rhenania	Steamship	Messrs. Dobie & Co.	Govan	United Kingdom	For Hamburg-Amerikanische Packetfahrt-Actien-Gesellschaft.
2 December	Seewo	Steamship	Messrs. John Duthie, Sons, & Co.	Aberdeen	United Kingdom	For Messrs. Matheson & Co.
2 December	Wycliffe	Steamship	Messrs. Ramage & Ferguson	Leith	United Kingdom	For Wycliffe Steamship Company (Limited).
3 December	Homer	Steamship	Messrs. Readhead & Sons	South Shields	United Kingdom	For Messrs. Dick & Page.
3 December	Nereus	Steamship	Messrs. Robert Duncan & Co.	Port Glasgow	United Kingdom	For Colin S. Caird.
4 December	Lark	Schooner	William Westacott Shipbuilding Co.	Barnstaple	United Kingdom	For Royal Navy.
4 December	Romeo	Steamship	Messrs. Murdoch & Murray	Port Glasgow	United Kingdom	For Marquis de Campo.
6 December	Gladstone	Tug	Richard Smith	Ashton-on-Ribble	United Kingdom	For Messrs. Winn & Co.
7 December	Disraeli	Tug	Richard Smith	Ashton-on-Ribble	United Kingdom	For Messrs. Winn & Co.
8 December	Endymion	Steamship	Messrs. Palmer's Shipbuilding and Iron Co.	Jarrow	United Kingdom	For Messrs. Hall Bros.
10 December	Mandarin	Steamship	Messrs. H. M'Intyre & Co.	Merksworth	United Kingdom	For private owner.
11 December	Olga	Carola-class corvette	AG Vulcan	Stettin	Germany	For Kaiserliche Marine.
15 December	Ballycotton	Steamship	W. Simons & Co.	Renfrew	United Kingdom	For Clyde Shipping Co.
15 December	Beignon	Steamship	Messrs. Richardson, Duck & Co.	South Stockton-on-Tees	United Kingdom	For private owner.
16 December	Garth Castle	Steamship	Messrs. John Elder & Co.	Govan	United Kingdom	For Messrs. Donald Currie & Co.
16 December	Libelle	Steamship	Messrs. Schlesinger Davis & Co.	Wallsend	United Kingdom	For O. L. Eichmann.
16 December	Sanitre	Steamship	Messrs. Dobson & Charles	Grangemouth	United Kingdom	For private owner.
18 December	Cardiff	Steamship	William Doxford & Sons	Sunderland	United Kingdom	For Morel Bros. & Co.
18 December	Easington	Steamship	Messrs. W. Gray & Co.	West Hartlepool	United Kingdom	For Messrs. G. T. Pearson & Co.
18 December	Egyptian Monarch	Steamship	Messrs. A. M'Millan & Son	Dumbarton	United Kingdom	For Royal Exchange Shipping Company.
18 December	Joseph F. Loubat	Schooner	Jacob S. Ellis	Tottenville, New York	United States	For New York Pilots.
18 December	St. Pauli	Steamship	Short Bros.	Sunderland	United Kingdom	For J. H. Lorentzen & Co.
18 December	Yan Ylan	Steamship	Edward Finch & Co. (Limited)	Chepstow	United Kingdom	For Messrs. Osborn & Wallis.
20 December	Gainsborough	Steamship	Earle's Shipbuilding	Hull	United Kingdom	For Manchester, Sheffield and Lincolnshire Railway.
20 December	Mount Hermon	Steamship	Messrs. Alexander Stephen & Sons	Glasgow	United Kingdom	For John Smith.
21 December	Macapa	Steamship	Messrs. Blackwood & Gordon	Port Glasgow	United Kingdom	For Amazon River Steam Navigation Company.
22 December	Contest	Steamship	James Laing	Sunderland	United Kingdom	For William France.
22 December	Roumania	Steamship	Messrs. David & William Henderson & Co.	Meadowside	United Kingdom	For Anchor Line.
28 December	Marie	Steamship	Palmer's Shipbuilding and Iron Co.	Jarrow	United Kingdom	For Messrs. Burdick & Cook.
30 December	Allegheny	Steamship	Messrs. M. Pearse & Co.	Stockton-on-Tees	United Kingdom	For private owner.
30 December	Barbados	Steamship	Messrs. Gray & Co.	West Hartlepool	United Kingdom	For Quebec Steamship Co.
30 December	Cranbrook	Steamship	Tyne Iron Shipbuilding Co.	Wallsend	United Kingdom	For private owner.
30 December	Lee	Steamship	W. Simons & Co.	Renfrew	United Kingdom	For City of Cork Steamship Co.
30 December	Nemesis	Steamship	Thomas Turnbull & Sons	Whitby	United Kingdom	For Huddart, Parker & Co.
December	Garth Castle	Steamship			United Kingdom	For Messrs. Donald Currie & Co.
Unknown date	Acacia	Ketch	David Banks & Co.	Plymouth	United Kingdom	For D. Banks & Co.
Unknown date	Actaea	Schooner		Kennebunk, Maine	United States	For David Sears.
Unknown date	Albert	Steamship	Blumer & Co	Sunderland	United Kingdom	For Chevilotte Frères.
Unknown date	Allerton	Steamship	Messrs. E. Withy & Co.	Middleton	United Kingdom	For private owner.
Unknown date	Alverson	Steamship	Alexander Stephen & Sons	Linthouse	United Kingdom	For Osborn & Wallis.
Unknown date	Andrea Vagilano	Merchantman	Bartram, Haswell & Co.	Sunderland	United Kingdom	For Vagilano Bros.
Unknown date	Annie	Sandbagger sloop	David O. Richmond,	Mystic, Connecticut	United States	For Henry H. Tift.
Unknown date	Annie	Steamship	Messrs. C. S. Swan & Hunter	Wallsend	United Kingdom	For Herr Rodenacker.
Unknown date	Anthracite	Steamship	Messrs. Schlesinger, Davis & Co.	Wallsend	United Kingdom	For Robert M'Calmot.
Unknown date	Arandbhan	Steamship	Henry Murray & Co	Port Glasgow	United Kingdom	For Maclaren, Crum & Co.
Unknown date	Arandhu	Steamship	Henry Murray & Co	Port Glasgow	United Kingdom	For Maclaren, Crum & Co.
Unknown date	Avon	Steamship	James Laing	Sunderland	United Kingdom	For Royal Mail Steam Packet Company.
Unknown date	Badibou	Steamship	Messrs. Edwards & Symess	Cubitt Town	United Kingdom	For Gounelle et Fils.
Unknown date	Bayswater	Merchantman	John Blumer & Co.	Sunderland	United Kingdom	For Watts, Ward & Co.
Unknown date	Beckton	Merchantman	Joseph L. Thompson & Sons	Sunderland	United Kingdom	For Frederick Gordon & Co.
Unknown date	Belturbet	Steamboat	W. Allsup & Sons	Preston	United Kingdom	For Richard Smith.
Unknown date	Billiton	Steamship	Blackwood & Gordon	Port Glasgow	United Kingdom	For Lee Ken Younbg.
Unknown date	Blacketts	Steamship	Messrs. W. Gray & Co.	West Hartlepool	United Kingdom	For private owner.
Unknown date	Booldana	Steamship	William Denny & Bros.	Dumbarton	United Kingdom	For British India Steam Navigation Company.
Unknown date	Brankston	Merchantman	John Blumer & co	Sunderland	United Kingdom	For Fisher, Renwick & Co.
Unknown date	Brinkburn	Steamship	Messrs. Swan & Hunter	Wallsend	United Kingdom	For Messrs. Robert Bell & Co.
Unknown date	Calliope Nicolopulo	Merchantman	Bartram, Haswell & Co.	Sunderland	United Kingdom	For D. Nicolopulo.
Unknown date	Canonbury	Merchantman	John Blumer & Co.	Sunderland	United Kingdom	For Watts, Ward & Co.
Unknown date	Churucca	Merchantman	Osbourne, Graham & Co.	Sunderland	United Kingdom	For Bautizado Churucca.
Unknown date	Colo Colo	Torpedo boat	Yarrow & Co.	Poplar	United Kingdom	For Chilean Navy.
Unknown date	Columbo	Tug	Messrs. R. & H. Green	Blackwall	United Kingdom	For private owner.
Unknown date	Colombo	Paddle steamer	Messrs. Laird Bros.	Birkenhead	United Kingdom	For private owner.
Unknown date	Confidence	Sternwheeler	William Cramp & Sons	Philadelphia, Pennsylvania	United States	For private owner.
Unknown date	Coppename	Barquentine	William Pickersgill	Sunderland	United Kingdom	For A. Pearson & Co.
Unknown date	County of Merioneth	Merchantman	William Doxford & Sons	Sunderland	United Kingdom	For W. Thomas & Co.
Unknown date	Craigrownie	Steamship	Messrs. Ramage & Ferguson	Leith	United Kingdom	For Messrs. Walker, Donald & Co.
Unknown date	Cymus	Steamship	Messrs. E. Withy & Co.	Middleton	United Kingdom	For private owner.
Unknown date	Daisy	Sternwheeler		Seattle	(United States) Washington Territory	For Washington Steamboat Company.
Unknown date	Deepdale	Merchantman	James Laing	Sunderland	United Kingdom	For Dixon & Wilson.
Unknown date	Dom Alfonso	Paddle Steamer	Thames Iron Works	Blackwall	United Kingdom	For South Eastern Railway.
Unknown date	Donato	Steamship	London and Glasgow Iron Ship Building and Engineering Company	Govan	United Kingdom	For Line de Vapor Serra.
Unknown date	Eident	Merchantman	Short Bros.	Sunderland	United Kingdom	For James Westoll.
Unknown date	Eleanor	Paddle steamer	MacMillan and Sons	Dumbarton	United Kingdom	For Olano, Larrinaga & Co.
Unknown date	Elfle	Steamship	Messrs. W. Gray & Co.	West Hartlepool	United Kingdom	For private owner.
Unknown date	El Mensajers	Steamship	John Elder & Co.	Govan	United Kingdom	For East Argentine Railway Co.
Unknown date	Era	Steamship		Peterhead	United Kingdom	For private owner.
Unknown date	Falcone	Steamship	J. M'Kenzie & Co.	Leith	United Kingdom	For John C. Turner.
Unknown date	Florence	Merchantman	Joseph L. Thompson & Sons	Sunderland	United Kingdom	For Gordon & Stamp.
Unknown date	Foam	Steamship		Sydney	New South Wales	For Lewis Thomas.
Unknown date	Forrara	Steamship	R. Steele & Co.	Greenock	United Kingdom	For Leith, Hull & Hamburg Steamship Co.
Unknown date	Francisco Reyes	Steamship	A. & J. Inglis	Partick	United Kingdom	For Francisco Reyes.
Unknown date	Frogmore	Steamship	Messrs. Thomas Royden & Sons	Liverpool	United Kingdom	For Messrs. Johnston & Co.
Unknown date	Gamecock	Tug	Messrs. T. Brassey & Co.	Birkenhead	United Kingdom	For W. Becket Hill.
Unknown date	Ganges	Steam launch	Thomas B. Seath & Co.	Rutherglen	United Kingdom	For J. Finlay & Co.
Unknown date	Gervase	Merchantman	Osbourne, Graham & Co.	Sunderland	United Kingdom	For Mediterranean Steam Shipping Co.
Unknown date	Gironde et Garonne No. 2	Paddle steamer	Messrs. H. M'Intyre & Co.	Paisley	United Kingdom	For Cie. Maritime Gironde et Garonne.
Unknown date	Gladstone	Barge	William Swan & Co.	Maryhill	United Kingdom	For Clyde Shipping Co.
Unknown date	Glenfruin	Steamship	London and Glasgow Iron Ship Building and Engineering Company	Govan	United Kingdom	For M'Gregor, Gow & Co.
Unknown date	Grappler	Merchantman	James Laing	Sunderland	United Kingdom	For West India & Panama Telegraph Co.
Unknown date	Grivița	Gunboat	Stabilimento Tecnico Triestino	Trieste	Austria-Hungary	For Romanian Navy.
Unknown date	Gulf of Panama	Steamship		Low Walker-on-Tyne	United Kingdom	For private owner.
Unknown date	Heather Bell	Steamship	Barr & Shearer.	Ardrossan	United Kingdom	For Provost Barr.
Unknown date	Hexham	Steamship	Messrs. A. Leslie & Co.	Hebburn	United Kingdom	For Messrs James Turpie & Partners.
Unknown date	Hope Haynes	Schooner		Wiscasset, Maine	United States	For private owner.
Unknown date	Hooghly	Steam launch	Thomas B. Seath & Co.	Rutherglen	United Kingdom	For J. Finlay & Co.
Unknown date	Humber	Steamship	London and Glasgow Iron Ship Building and Engineering Company	Govan	United Kingdom	For Royal Mail Steam Packet Company.
Unknown date	Huzara	Steamship	A. & J. Inglis	Partick	United Kingdom	For British India Steam Navigation Company.
Unknown date	Ilex	Steamship	Messrs. E. Withy & Co.	Middleton	United Kingdom	For private owner.
Unknown date	Inchgarvie	Steamship	Blackwood & Gordon	Port Glasgow	United Kingdom	For W. Arrol & Co.
Unknown date	II	Steam lighter	Messrs. Ramage & Ferguson	Leith	United Kingdom	For Messrs. James Currie & Sons.
Unknown date	Irrawaddy	Steam launch	Thomas B. Seath & Co.	Rutherglen	United Kingdom	For P. Henderson & Co.
Unknown date	Joseph Ferens	Merchantman	Bartram, Haswell & Co	Sunderland	United Kingdom	For Hunting & Pattison.
Unknown date	Joshua Nicholson	Steamship	Tyne Iron Shipbuilding Co.	Willington Quay	United Kingdom	For Messrs. Tully, Wallace & Co.
Unknown date	Julieta	Steamship	Dobie & Co.	Govan	United Kingdom	For private owner.
Unknown date	Katherine	Tug		Houghton	(United States) Washington Territory	For private owner.
Unknown date	Konneruka	Steamship	Russell & Co.	Port Glasgow	United Kingdom	For Illawarra Steamship Co.
Unknown date	Larpool	Merchantman	Joseph L. Thompson & Sons	Sunderland	United Kingdom	For John H. Barry.
Unknown date	Latona	Fishing trawler	Edwin Barter	Brixham	United Kingdom	For John T. Wootton.
Unknown date	Laxham	Steamship	Messrs. John Readhead & Sons	South Shields	United Kingdom	For Robert Harrowing.
Unknown date	Lily	Paddle steamer	Cammell Laird	Birkenhead	United Kingdom	For London and North Western Railway.
Unknown date	L'Isolano	Steamship	D. Allan & Co.	Leith	United Kingdom	For private owner.
Unknown date	Lizzie Stewart	Merchantman	The Strand Slipway Co.	Sunderland	United Kingdom	For John Lacey.
Unknown date	Loch Maree	Steamship	Messrs. Gourlay Bros. & Co.	Dundee	United Kingdom	For Loch Line.
Unknown date	Lord Jeffrey	Steamship	Tyne Iron Shipbuilding Company	Newcastle upon Tyne	United Kingdom	For West African Steam Navigation Company.
Unknown date	Lylie	Steamship	H. Macintyre & Co.	Paisley	United Kingdom	For private owner.
Unknown date	Mamelena II	Steamship	D. Allan & Co.	Leith	United Kingdom	For private owner.
Unknown date	Maria	Paddle steamer	Messrs. Laird Bros.	Birkenhead	United Kingdom	For private owner.
Unknown date	Mari Vagliano	Merchantman	Bartram, Haswell & Co.	Sunderland	United Kingdom	For Vagliano Bros.
Unknown date	Mars	Steamship	James Laing	Sunderland	United Kingdom	For Koninklijke Nederlandse Stoomboot-Maatschappij.
Unknown date	Meda	Schooner	William Westacott Ship Building Co.	Barnstaple	United Kingdom	For Royal Navy.
Unknown date	Mercurius	Steamship	The Strand Slipway Co.	Sunderland	United Kingdom	For Koninklijke Nederlandse Stoomboot-Maatschappij.
Unknown date	Millom	Merchantman	Osbourne, Graham & Co	Sunderland	United Kingdom	For G. Nelson.
Unknown date	Miner	Tug	Barrow Ship Building Co. Ltd.	Barrow-in-Furness	United Kingdom	For War Office.
Unknown date	Minerva	Steamship	James Laing	Sunderland	United Kingdom	For Koninklijke Nederlandse Stoomboot-Maatschappij.
Unknown date	Montauk	Fishing trawler		Kennebunk, Maine	United States	For private owner.
Unknown date	Mount Etna	Paddle tug	R. Chambers	Dumbarton	United Kingdom	For private owner.
Unknown date	Natter	Wespe-class gunboat		Bremen	Germany	For Kaiserliche Marine.
Unknown date	Neptune	Steamship	Messrs. Lewis & Co.	Blackwall	United Kingdom	For George Doo.
Unknown date	Ngawoon	Steamship	William Denny & Bros.	Dumbarton	United Kingdom	For Irrawaddy Flottila Co.
Unknown date	Nile	Thames barge	Peter Blaker	Crayford	United Kingdom	For Edwared Rutter.
Unknown date	Nora	Yacht	John Macadam.	Govan	United Kingdom	For Messrs. Allan.
Unknown date	Norfolk	Steamship	Dobie & Co.	Govan	United Kingdom	For private owner.
Unknown date	Noukmyee	Steamship	William Denny & Bros.	Dumbarton	United Kingdom	For Irrawaddy Flotilla Co.
Unknown date	Onward	Steamship	Murdoch & Murray	Port Glasgow	United Kingdom	For Great Northern Steam Ship Fish Carrying Co.
Unknown date	Planet	Lightship	Messrs. R. & J. Evans & Co.	Liverpool	United Kingdom	For unknown owner.
Unknown date	Princess Beatrice	Paddle Steamer	Barclay, Curle & Co.	Whiteinch	United Kingdom	For Southampton and Isle of Wight Steam Packet Co.
Unknown date	Quebec	Steamship	Messrs. W. Gray & Co.	West Hartlepool	United Kingdom	For private owner.
Unknown date	Reaumur	Merchantman	Osbourne, Graham & Co	Sunderland	United Kingdom	For A. D'Orbigny & Faustin, Fils.
Unknown date	Reindeer	Steamship	Messrs. W. Gray & Co.	West Hartlepool	United Kingdom	For private owner.
Unknown date	Renalder	Steamship	Alexander Stephen & Sons	Linthouse	United Kingdom	For W. Thomson & Co.
Unknown date	Rhuabon	Steamship		Jarrow	United Kingdom	For Messrs John Cory and Sons.
Unknown date	Rohilla	Steamship	Caird & Co.	Greenock	United Kingdom	For Peninsular and Oriental Steam Navigation Company.
Unknown date	Rosetta	Steamship	Messrs. N. Sara & Sons	Falmouth or Penryn	United Kingdom	For Messrs. H. Deeble & Sons.
Unknown date	Rothesay	Steamship	Palmer's Shipbuilding and Iron Co.	Jarrow	United Kingdom	For Messrs. M'Naughton & Co.
Unknown date	Sahara	Steamship		Whitby	United Kingdom	For Bedoum Steam Navigation Company (Limited).
Unknown date	Scotia	Barque	Troon Shipbuilding Co.	Troon	United Kingdom	For Thomas Steele.
Unknown date	Sea King	Steamship	D. Allan & Co.	Leith	United Kingdom	For private owner.
Unknown date	Sendall	Steamship	Messrs. W. Gray & Co.	West Hartlepool	United Kingdom	For private owner.
Unknown date	Siren	Steam yacht	Messrs. Cunliffe & Dunlop	Port Glasgow	United Kingdom	For James Coats Jr.
Unknown date	Sissie	Steamship	H. Macintyre & Co.	Paisley	United Kingdom	For private owner.
Unknown date	St. Albans	Steamship	Messrs. T. Royden & Sons	Liverpool	United Kingdom	For Messrs. Rankin, Gilmour & Co.
Unknown date	Starley Hall	Steamship	Messrs. Ramage & Ferguson	Leith	United Kingdom	For London and Edinburgh Shipping Co.
Unknown date	St. Bernard	Steamship	Messrs. T. Royden & Sons	Liverpool	United Kingdom	For Messrs. Rankin, Gilmour & Co.
Unknown date	St. Columba	Steamship	Messrs. T. Royden & Sons	Liverpool	United Kingdom	For Messrs. Rankin, Gilmour & Co.
Unknown date	Storm Queen	Steamship	Messrs. C. S. Swan & Hunter	Wallsend	United Kingdom	For Messrs. Ridley, Son & Tully.
Unknown date	Sunbeam	Tug	Messrs. Lewis & Co.	Blackwall Point	United Kingdom	For Messrs. Reading & Palmer.
Unknown date	Tamarang	Steamship	Russell & Co.	Port Glasgow	United Kingdom	For Carlson & M'Ilwraith.
Unknown date	Thames	Merchantman	Osbourne, Graham & Co	Sunderland	United Kingdom	For private owner.
Unknown date	Tharsis	Steamship	John Blumer & Co	Sunderland	United Kingdom	For Scott Bros.
Unknown date	The Hartlepools	Steamship	Messrs. W. Gray & Co.	West Hartlepool	United Kingdom	For private owner.
Unknown date	Thooreah	Steamship	William Denny & Bros.	Dumbarton	United Kingdom	For Irrawaddy Flotilla Co.
Unknown date	Tiger	Yawl	Mr. Hicks	Plymouth	United Kingdom	For Mr. Rasch.
Unknown date	Toro Submarino	Submarine	Federico Blume Othon		Peru	For Peruvian Navy.
Unknown date	Tyne	Steamship	Campbeltown Ship Building Co.	Campbeltown	United Kingdom	For Fisher, Renwick & Co.
Unknown date	Violet	Steamship	Joseph L. Thompson & Sons	Sunderland	United Kingdom	For Gordon & Stamp.
Unknown date	Vixen	Tug	W. Allsup & Sons	Preston	United Kingdom	For Thomas Vere Fox.
Unknown date	Virent	Steamship	Short Bros.	Sunderland	United Kingdom	For James Westoll.
Unknown date	Wallace Brothers	Steamship	Thomas B. Seath & Co.	Rutherglen	United Kingdom	For Wallace Bros.
Unknown date	Water Witch	Steamship	J. M'Kenzie & Co.	Leith	United Kingdom	For private owner.
Unknown date	Weatherall	Steamship	Tyne Iron Shipbuilding Co.	Newcastle upon Tyne	United Kingdom	For Messrs. Fisher, Renwick & Co.
Unknown date	Woodhopper	Hopper barge	Harland & Wolff	Belfast	United Kingdom	For White Star Line.
Unknown date	Yoritomo Maru	Merchantman	Robert Thompson & Sons	Sunderland	United Kingdom	For Yonoske Mitsui.
Unknown date	No. 8	Hopper barge	Messrs. Ramage & Ferguson	Leith	United Kingdom	For Leith Dock Commissioners.
Unknown date	64	Torpedo boat	Messrs. Thorneycroft & Co.	Chiswick	United Kingdom	For Admiralty.
Unknown date	65	Torpedo boat	Messrs. Thorneycroft & Co.	Chiswick	United Kingdom	For Admiralty.
Unknown date	68	Torpedo boat	Messrs. Thorneycroft & Co.	Chiswick	United Kingdom	For Admiralty.
Unknown date	201	Steamship	Messrs. T. Royden & Sons	Liverpool	United Kingdom	For private owner.
Unknown date	Unnamed	Steam launch	John Elder & Co.	Govan	United Kingdom	For Russian Government.
Unknown date	Unnamed	Steam launch	John Elder & Co.	Govan	United Kingdom	For Argentine Government.
Unknown date	Unnamed	Barge	D. & H. Henderson & Co.	Partick	United Kingdom	For H. B. Huges.
Unknown date	Two unnamed vessels	Barges	H. Macintyre & Co.	Paisley	United Kingdom	For Atlas Steamship Co.
Unknown date	Unnamed	Steam launch	H. Macintyre & Co.	Paisley	United Kingdom	For A. Chaplin & Co.
Unknown date	Unnamed	Anchor boat	Blackwood & Gordon	Port Glasgow	United Kingdom	For J. King & Co.
Unknown date	Three unnamed vessels	Barges	Henry Murray & Co	Port Glasgow	United Kingdom	For National Brazilian Steamship Co.
Unknown date	Unnamed	Paddle steamer	Henry Murray & Co	Port Glasgow	United Kingdom	For National Brazilian Steamship Co.
Unknown date	Unnamed	Launch	Lobnitz & Co.	Renfrew	United Kingdom	For private owner.
Unknown date	Unnamed	Ferry	Napier, Shanks & Bell.	Yoker	United Kingdom	For Belfast Commissioners.
Unknown date	Three unnamed vessels	Steam yachts	Jonathan Reid & Co.	Port Glasgow	United Kingdom	For private owners.
Unknown date	Unnamed	Barque	Jonathan Reid & Co.	Port Glasgow	United Kingdom	For private owner.
Unknown date	Unnamed	Steam launch	Fullarton & Co.	Paisley	United Kingdom	For private owner.
Unknown date	Unnamed	Steam launch	Abercorn Shipbuilding Co.	Paisley	United Kingdom	For private owner.
Unknown date	Unnamed	Steam yacht	Abercorn Shipbuilding Co.	Paisley	United Kingdom	For private owner.
Unknown date	Unnamed	Steamboat	Abercorn Shipbuilding Co.	Paisley	United Kingdom	For private owner.
Unknown date	Unnamed	Steam yacht	John Macadam.	Govan	United Kingdom	For Mr. Brannagan.
Unknown date	Two unnamed vessels	Yachts	John Macadam.	Govan	United Kingdom	For private owners.
