= List of shipwrecks in December 1883 =

The list of shipwrecks in December 1883 includes ships sunk, foundered, grounded, or otherwise lost during December 1883.

== 1 December ==
List of shipwrecks: 1 December 1883
Ship	State	Description
Alona, and Cora	Norway	The brig Alona collided with the brigantine Cora in the North Sea 50 nautical miles (93 km) east of Lowestoft, Suffolk, United Kingdom. Five crew from Alona and four from Cora were rescued by the fishing smack Strive (United Kingdom). Alona was on a voyage from Saint-Valery-sur-Somme, Somme, France to Grimstad. Cora was on a voyage from South Shields, County Durham, United Kingdom to the West Indies.
Dungonnell	United Kingdom	The steamship ran aground and sank in the River Mersey at Garston, Lancashire. She was refloated on 15 December and taken into Birkenhead, Cheshire.
Matrosen	Norway	The brigantine was driven ashore at Flekkefjord with the loss of four of her crew. She was on a voyage from Antwerp, Belgium to Stavanger. She was a total loss.
Tasman	Tasmania	The steamship struck a reef and foundered between Cheverton Rock and the Hippolyte Rocks while on a voyage from Sydney to Hobart. No lives were lost.

== 2 December ==
List of shipwrecks: 2 December 1883
Ship	State	Description
Breeze	United Kingdom	The schooner ran aground on the Goodwin Sands, Kent and was abandoned by her three crew. She was on a voyage from Newcastle upon Tyne, Northumberland to Southampton, Hampshire. She was refloated with assistance from the lugger Champion (United Kingdom) and taken into port.
George Blohm	Germany	The barque was run into in the Elbe by the steamships Hyp (France) and Prinz Leopold (Germany) and was severely damaged. George Blohm was on a voyage from Apia, Samoan Islands to Hamburg.
John Johnasson	United Kingdom	The ship collided with the steamship Amy Dora (United Kingdom) in the River Tyne and was beached. She was on a voyage from London to the River Tyne. She was refloated and taken into dock.
Mona	United Kingdom	The sloop was wrecked on the West Hoyle Bank, in Liverpool Bay. She was on a voyage from Glasgow, Renfrewshire to the River Dee.
Ottar	Norway	The schooner collided with the steamship Flora (United Kingdom) off Finkenwerder, Germany. She caught fire and sank. Her crew were rescued by Flora.
Rover's Bride	United Kingdom	The smack caught fire and was abandoned in the North Sea.

== 3 December ==
List of shipwrecks: 3 December 1883
Ship	State	Description
Plantagenet	United Kingdom	The ship ran aground at Llanelly, Glamorgan.
Rheola	United Kingdom	The steamship collided with the steamship Antwerpia (Flag unknown) in the Kingroad and was severely damaged. Rheola was on a voyage from Smyrna, Ottoman Empire to Bristol, Gloucestershire. She was taken into Bristol.
Three Sons	United States	The schooner collided with the steamship Conoho (United States) and sank off Cove Point, Maryland with the loss of two of her crew.
Unnamed	United States	The pilot boat was run down and sunk off Fire Island, New York by the steamship Alaska) with the loss of all on board.
Unnamed	United Kingdom	The barge sank in the Royal Victoria Dock, London.

== 4 December ==
List of shipwrecks: 4 December 1883
Ship	State	Description
Content	Netherlands	Content The schooner was driven ashore at Zandvoort, North Holland. She was on a voyage from Gothenburg, Sweden to Dordrecht, South Holland.
Ethel	United Kingdom	The steamship ran aground in the Clyde.
Expert	United Kingdom	The schooner was driven ashore at Leith, Lothian.
Hast	Norway	The schooner was beached at Maassluis, South Holland. She was on a voyage from Vyborg, Grand Duchy of Finland to Dordrecht.
Maria Sophia	Germany	The ship departed from Wilmington, North Carolina, United States for Wolgast. No further trace, reported overdue.
Paradox	United Kingdom	The steamship ran aground and sank at Amble, Northumberland. Her crew survived. She was on a voyage from Aberdeen to Amble.
Pauline	Germany	The schooner was abandoned in the North Sea off the Lemon and Ower Lightship ( Trinity House). Four people, belonging to the smacks Eleonore and Progress (both United Kingdom) were taken off by the schooner Mette (Denmark).
Phœnix	Sweden	The barque was driven ashore at Minatitlán, Mexico. She was on a voyage from La Rochelle, Charente-Inférieure, France to Minatitlán.
William A. Pew	United States	The schooner was lost at Grand Manan, New Brunswick, Canada. Her crew were rescued.

== 5 December ==
List of shipwrecks: 5 December 1883
Ship	State	Description
Lucie Marie	France	The schooner collided with the steamship Lucien and was severely damaged. Lucie Marie put into Havre de Grâce, Seine-Inférieure.

== 6 December ==
List of shipwrecks: 6 December 1883
Ship	State	Description
Andreas	Sweden	The brigantine was driven ashore on Læsø, Denmark. She was on a voyage from Vestervik to Hartlepool, County Durham, United Kingdom.
Elizabeth Richards	United Kingdom	The schooner struck the Admiralty Pier, Dover, Kent and was wrecked. Her crew were rescued. She was on a voyage from Calais, France to Dover.
Lady Louisa Ker	United Kingdom	The ship was destroyed by fire at Magheramorne, County Antrim.
Melanaria	United Kingdom	The schooner foundered 8 nautical miles (15 km) off Caldy Island, Pembrokeshire. Her crew survived.
Plantyn	Belgium	The steamship was waterlogged by heavy seas on 17 November which extinguished the fires. six people were lost. The 60 survivors kept the vessel afloat via the pumps and were finally rescued by the brigantine G. D. T. ( (United Kingdom of Great Britain and Ireland) Jersey). Plantyn was on a voyage from New York, United States to Antwerp.
Providence	Flag unknown	The ship was driven ashore at Kingsdown, Kent. Her six crew were rescued by rocket apparatus. She was on a voyage from Fredrikshald, Norway to Rochefort, Charente-Inférieure, France.
Stabswache	Germany	The schooner was driven ashore at Thisted, Denmark. She was on a voyage from Newcastle upon Tyne, Northumberland, United Kingdom to "Faxo". She was a total loss.
Theodor Burchard	Germany	The steamship ran aground on the Domesnes Reef, in the Baltic Sea. Her crew were rescued.

== 7 December ==
List of shipwrecks: 7 December 1883
Ship	State	Description
Albertina, and Edgworth	United Kingdom	The steamships collided off Swansea, Glamorgan and were both severely damaged. Edgworth was on a voyage from Bilbao, Spain to Swansea.
Doris	Germany	The schooner was driven ashore at Bodenwinkel.
Lancope	Greece	The brig foundered in the Bristol Channel 20 nautical miles (37 km) west of Lundy Island, Devon, United Kingdom. Her eight crew were rescued by a pilot boat.

== 8 December ==
List of shipwrecks: 8 December 1883
Ship	State	Description
Albert	United Kingdom	The steamship ran aground at Hull, Yorkshire. She was on a voyage from Rotterdam, South Holland to Hull. She was refloated and found to be severely leaky.
Argo	United Kingdom	The schooner struck a sunken rock and foundered in the Irish Sea 1 1/2 nautical miles (2.8 km) off Ballywalter, County Antrim. Her crew survived. She was on a voyage from Port Dinorwic, Caernarfonshire to Glasgow, Renfrewshire.
Calypso	United Kingdom	The steamship ran aground in the Gironde downstream of Pauillac, Gironde, France.
Kitty	United Kingdom	The ship departed from Dieppe, Seine-Inférieure for Runcorn, Cheshire. No further trace, reported overdue.
Nile	United Kingdom	The smack was driven ashore at Berwick upon Tweed, Northumberland.
Noach III	Netherlands	The ship was driven ashore at Lydd, Kent, United Kingdom. She was on a voyage from Rotterdam, South Holland to Surabaya, Netherlands East Indies. She was later refloated and towed into Vlissingen, Zeeland by two tugs.
Sussex	United Kingdom	The barque was driven ashore and sank at Natal, Brazil. Her crew were rescued. She was on a voyage from Pernambuco to the Rio Grande do Norte.
Zelos	Norway	The ship ran aground off Great Yarmouth, Norfolk, United Kingdom. She was refloated and assisted into Harwich, Essex, United Kingdom in a waterlogged condition by a tug and a lifeboat.

== 9 December ==
List of shipwrecks: 9 December 1883
Ship	State	Description
Deucalion	United Kingdom	The barque collided with the steamship Newma and was damaged. Deucalion was on a voyage from Rotterdam, South Holland, Netherlands to London. She put into Dover, Kent in a leaky condition.
Eglantine	United Kingdom	The ship departed from Seaham, County Durham for Sheerness, Kent. No further trace, reported overdue.
Emma	United Kingdom	The ship departed from Hartlepool, County Durham for London. No further trace, reported missing.
Nevera	United Kingdom	The steamship was damaged by fire at Buenos Aires, Argentina.
Nieuwe Maas VI	Netherlands	The dredger was run into by the steamship Carlotta (Norway) and sank at Dunkirk, Nord, France. Nieuwe Maas VI was being towed from Dunkirk to Boulogne, Pas-de-Calais, France.
Unnamed	Argentina	The lighter sank at Buenos Aires.

== 10 December ==
List of shipwrecks: 10 December 1883
Ship	State	Description
Aurora	United Kingdom	The ship ran aground off Pagensand, Germany. She was on a voyage from London to Hamburg, Germany.
Capella	United Kingdom	The schooner sprang a leak and was beached on Ailsa Craig. Her crew were rescued. Capella was on a voyage from Ayr to Belfast, County Antrim. She subsequently floated off and sank.
Enterprise	Flag unknown	The steamship foundered in Lake Huron with the loss of seven of the thirteen people on board.
Fenna	Germany	The schooner was driven ashore in the Rio Grande.
Nymphen	United Kingdom	The ship departed from Warkworth, Northumberland for Boulogne, Pas-de-Calais, France. No further trace, reported missing.
Ruby	United Kingdom	The ship ran aground on the Silloth Bank, in the Irish Sea off the coast of Cumberland and sank. Her crew survived. She was on a voyage from Liverpool, Lancashire to Silloth, Cumberland.
San Augustin	United Kingdom	The steamship caught fire north of A Coruña, Spain and was abandoned by her crew. She was on a voyage from Manila, Spanish East Indies to London. She was subsequently towed into A Coruña, repaired and returned to service in June 1885.
Satanella	United Kingdom	The ship departed from the River Tyne for Woolwich, Kent. No further trace, reported missing.

== 11 December ==
List of shipwrecks: 11 December 1883
Ship	State	Description
Activ	Flag unknown	The barque was driven ashore at Rosses Point, County Sligo, United Kingdom.
Auk	United Kingdom	The steamship foundered off the Zuid Hinder Bank, in the North Sea off the coast of Zeeland, Netherlands with the loss of all 21 crew. She was on a voyage from Liverpool, Lancashire to Rotterdam, South Holland, Netherlands.
Carlo Minetto	Italy	The barque was driven ashore at Rosses Point. She was refloated.
Charlotte	United Kingdom	The ship departed from Pittenweem, Fife for West Hartlepool, County Durham. No further trace, reported overdue.
Fay	United Kingdom	The schooner was driven ashore at Silloth, Cumberland. She was refloated on 29 December.
Flying Fish	United Kingdom	The schooner was driven ashore and caught fire in the Clyde.
Flying Scud	United Kingdom	The barque was driven ashore in the Clyde.
Gazelle	United Kingdom	The schooner was driven ashore and severely damaged at Milford Haven, Pembrokeshire.
George Bertram, and Gyda	United Kingdom; Norway	The brigs collided at Grimsby, Lincolnshire and were both severely damaged.
Gilsland, and Netley Abbey	United Kingdom	The steamships collided off Malta and were both severely damaged. Both vessels were beached, Gilsland with the assistance of a tug.
Guy Fawkes	United Kingdom	The steamship was driven ashore in the Clyde. She was later refloated and taken into Greenock, Renfrewshirea.
Iron Duke	United Kingdom	The steamship was driven ashore at Dunure, Ayrshire with the loss of her captain.
Isle of Bute	United Kingdom	The steamship ran aground and sank at Bilbao, Spain.
Jane	United Kingdom	The ship departed from Leven, Fife for Stockton-on-Tees, County Durham. No further trace, reported missing.
Martha	United Kingdom	The steamship departed from Great Yarmouth, Norfolk for the North Sea fishing grounds. No further trace, reported missing.
Said	United Kingdom	The steamship departed from Newcastle upon Tyne, Northumberland for London. No further trace, reported missing.
Secret	United Kingdom	The ketch was destroyed by fire at Tralee, County Kerry.
Staffa	United Kingdom	The steamship departed from the River Tyne for Cádiz, Spain. No further trace, reported missing.
Susanna	United Kingdom	The ship departed from Sunderland, County Durham for Great Yarmouth. No further trace, reported missing.
Tweed	United Kingdom	The steamship was driven ashore at Högänas, Sweden.
Unity	United Kingdom	The lighter sank at Rosses Point.
Walkyrien	Norway	The barque was driven ashore at Dunure with the loss of a crew member. She was on a voyage from Richmond, Virginia, United States to Glasgow, Renfrewshire.

== 12 December ==
List of shipwrecks: 12 December 1883
Ship	State	Description
Agnes Henderson	United Kingdom	The smack sank at Ardrossan, Ayrshire.
Baron Aberdare	United Kingdom	Baron Aberdare The full-rigged ship capsized in the Royal Victoria Dock, London.
Baroness Strathspey	United Kingdom	The schooner was driven ashore and wrecked at Fraserburgh, Aberdeenshire. Her five crew were rescued; three by rocket apparatus and two by the Fraserburgh Lifeboat. She was on a voyagte from Portsoy, Aberdeenshire to Sunderland, County Durham.
Christiana	United Kingdom	The smack sank at Ardrossan.
Columbine, HMS Hydra, Otter, and HSwMS Vanidas	United Kingdom; Royal Navy; United Kingdom; Royal Swedish Navy	The man-of-war Vanidas dragged her anchors at Sheerness, Kent. She collided with the coal hulks Columbine and Otter. Otter was driven into HMS Hydra. Severely damaged, she was moored with assistance from the tugboat HMS Sampson (Royal Navy), which then towed Columbine to an anchorage. Vanidas was anchored in the River Medway.
Dispatch	United Kingdom	The ship was wrecked on the Souter Bank, in the North Sea off the coast of Northumberland. Her crew were rescued. She was on a voyage from Sunderland, County Durham to Newhaven, Sussex.
Emily Malden	United Kingdom	The ketch foundered in the North Sea. Her crew were rescued by the steamship Marajah (United Kingdom). Emily Malden was on a voyage from Hull, Yorkshire to Dunkirk, Nord, France.
Etimologia	Italy	The barque was driven ashore and wrecked at Seaton Point, Cumberland, United Kingdom. Her crew survived.
Fanny	United Kingdom	The brigantine was driven into HMS Shannon (Royal Navy) in the Clyde.
Ferret	United Kingdom	The smack sank at Ardrossan, Ayrshire. Subsequently refloated and placed under repair.
Lady Steward	United Kingdom	The ship was driven through Rhyl Pier, Denbighshire and wrecked. Her crew were rescued. She was on a voyage from London to Saltney, Cheshire.
Maria Auguste	Sweden	The barque sprang a leak off Beachy Head, Sussex, United Kingdom. She was on a voyage from Skellefteå to the Mumbles, Glamorgan, United Kingdom. She was beached at Dover, Kent, United Kingdom.
Mars	United Kingdom	The barque was driven ashore at Greenock, Renfrewshire.
Maria	(United Kingdom of Great Britain and Ireland) Isle of Man	The schooner was driven ashore and wrecked between Nairn and Findhorn, Aberdeenshire.
Minnie Swift	United Kingdom	The ship was driven ashore on the Flatness, in the River Severn. She was on a voyage from New York, United States to Sharpness, Gloucestershire.
Telegraph	United Kingdom	The smack was driven ashore at Bridgwater, Somerset. She was on a voyage from Swansea, Glamorgan to Watchet, Somerset.
Victoria	United Kingdom	The steamship foundered off Brancaster, Norfolk. Her crew were rescued by the Skegness Lifeboat.
Wallachia	(United Kingdom of Great Britain and Ireland) Isle of Man	The ship was driven ashore and wrecked between Nairn and Findhorn.
Unnamed	United Kingdom	The barque was driven ashore at Greenock.
Unnamed	flag unknown	The brigantine was wrecked near Formby, Lancashire, United Kingdom. Her crew were rescued by the Formby Lifeboat.

== 13 December ==
List of shipwrecks: 13 December 1883
Ship	State	Description
Aludra	United Kingdom	The steamship was driven ashore on Texel, North Holland, Netherlands. Her crew were rescued.
Annie	United Kingdom	The schooner foundered in the North Sea with the loss of all eight crew. She was on a voyage from South Shields, County Durham to Aberdeen.
Astrologer	United Kingdom	The steamship was driven ashore and wrecked at Hellevoetsluis, Zeeland with the loss of three of her crew. The rest were reported missing.
Donar	United Kingdom	The ship was abandoned in the North Sea (52°30′N 2°47′E). Her crew were rescued by a smack.
Emma	(United Kingdom of Great Britain and Ireland) Jersey	The schooner was abandoned in the North Sea 8 nautical miles (15 km) off Ostend, West Flanders, Belgium. Her crew were rescued by the steamship Commercial (United Kingdom). Emma was subsequently taken into Ostend.
Martha Augusta	Sweden	The barque was beached at Dover, Kent, United Kingdom.
Mermaid	United Kingdom	The ship ran aground on the Horse Bank, in the River Mersey. Her crew survived. She was on a voyage from Quebec City, Canada to Liverpool, Lancashire.
Philomene	United Kingdom	The ship was driven ashore on Mauritius. She was on a voyagte from Cardiff, Glamorgan to Mauritius. She was refloated.
S. P. Weldon	United Kingdom	The full-rigged ship ran aground on the Spijkerplaat, in the North Sea off the coast of Zeeland, Netherlands.
Wilhelm	Netherlands	The ship ran aground in the Ems.
Woodman	United Kingdom	The schooner was driven ashore at Aberporth, Cardiganshire.
Unnamed	Flag unknown	The steamship ran aground on the Hinder Bank, in the North Sea off the coast of Zeeland.

== 14 December ==
List of shipwrecks: 14 December 1883
Ship	State	Description
Carl Konow	Norway	The steamship was driven ashore at Marske-by-the-Sea, Yorkshire, United Kingdom. She was on a voyage from Rochester, Kent to Middlesbrough, Yorkshire.
Castle Craig	United Kingdom	The steamship was driven ashore at Brook, Isle of Wight. Her crew were rescued by the Brook Lifeboat. She was on a voyage from Odesa, Russia to Antwerp, Belgium.
Catterina Cuppa	Flag unknown	The steamship ran aground on the Devil's Bank, in Liverpool Bay. She was on a voyage from Poti, Russia to Liverpool, Lancashire, United Kingdom. She was refloated and taken into Liverpool.
Mary Hulbert	Flag unknown	The schooner foundered in Lake Winnipeg with the loss of all twenty people on board.
Queen of England	United Kingdom	The smack foundered in the North Sea with the loss of two of her four crew. Survivors were rescued by a smack.
Royal Sailor	United Kingdom	The brig was wrecked at Rettimo, Greece. Her crew were rescued.
Swiftsure	United Kingdom	The barque was driven ashore at Tripoli, Ottoman Tripolitania. Her crew were rescued.
Ti Soskende	Norway	The ship departed from South Alloa, Clackmannanshire, United Kingdom for Christiania. No further trace, reported overdue.
Verona	United Kingdom	The steamship was driven ashore on Spiekeroog, Germany. Her crew were rescued. She was on a voyage from Leith, Lothian to Bremerhaven, Germany.

== 16 December ==
List of shipwrecks: 16 December 1883
Ship	State	Description
Ann	United Kingdom	The lugger collided with Cordelia (United Kingdom) and sank off "Crossing". Her crew were rescued by a schooner.
Annie	Canada	The brig was abandoned in the Atlantic Ocean (4°43′N 38°00′W). Her crew were rescued by Gardner Colby (United States). Annie was on a voyage from Montreal, Quebec to Buenos Aires, Argentina.
Don Pedro V	Italy	The brigantine foundered in the North Sea. Her nine crew were rescued by the steamship Brigadier (United Kingdom).
Harlingen	Germany	The ship foundered in the North Sea. Her crew were rescued by the steamship Brigadier (United Kingdom).

== 17 December ==
List of shipwrecks: 17 December 1883
Ship	State	Description
Bruno	Norway	The ship was driven ashore at Sandgate, Kent, United Kingdom. She was refloated and assisted into Dover, Kent in a leaky condition.
Remus	Spain	The steamship was driven ashore at Calapan, Spanish East Indies. She was refloated and taken into Manila with a hole in her bottom. It was intended that she would be taken to Hong Kong for repairs.
San Augustin	Spain	The steamship was destroyed by fire in the Bay of Biscay with the loss of at least eleven of the 85 people on board. Seventeen survivors were rescued by the steamship Grantully and one by the steamship Governor (both United Kingdom). San Augustin was on a voyage from Manila to Liverpool, Lancashire, United Kingdom.
William Woodbury	United States	The full-rigged ship caught fire at Bremerhaven, Germany and was scuttled.

== 18 December ==
List of shipwrecks: 18 December 1883
Ship	State	Description
Band of Hope	United Kingdom	The ship was run into by the steamship Wyedale (United Kingdom) and sank in the English Channel with the loss of two of her crew. Band of Hope was on a voyage from the Isle of Wight to Plymouth, Devon.
Nieman	France	The steamship was driven ashore at "Caristo", Greece. She was refloated and taken into Piraeus, Greece.

== 19 December ==
List of shipwrecks: 19 December 1883
Ship	State	Description
Burmah	United Kingdom	The barque was abandoned in a gale, sinking, in the Atlantic Ocean at (35°N 16°W) on a voyage from Rio Grande do Norte, Brazil to Halifax, Nova Scotia. Her crew were rescued after 19 days drifting by the vessel Resorta (Italy).
Cornwall	United Kingdom	The steamship foundered off the Saints. All on board took to the boats; they were rescued by the steamship Raoul Godard (France). Cornwall was on a voyage from Saint-Nazaire, Loire-Inférieure, France to Cardiff, Glamorgan.
Eberstein	Germany	The steamship ran aground off Albufeira, Portugal.
HMS Euphrates	Royal Navy	The Euphrates-class troopship ran aground off Gibraltar. She was refloated the next day.
Imer Arandoff	Norway	The barque was driven ashore near Gibraltar with the loss of five of her eleven crew. Survivors were rescued by rocket apparatus.
Isabella	United Kingdom	The schooner was run into by the steamship Bradley (United Kingdom) and sank at Hartlepool, County Durham.
Leatta	Austria-Hungary	The barque was driven ashore and wrecked at Cape Arzila, Morocco with the loss of eleven of her thirteen crew.
Punjaub	United Kingdom	The barque was wrecked near Tangier, Morocco with the loss of two of her crew. She was on a voyage from London to Cette, Hérault, France.

== 20 December ==
List of shipwrecks: 20 December 1883
Ship	State	Description
Accretive	United Kingdom	The steamship was driven ashore at "Hjelemen", Denmark. She was on a voyage from Newcastle upon Tyne, Northumberland to Aarhus, Denmark.
Mounts Bay	United Kingdom	The steamship caught fire at Liverpool, Lancashire.
Ymer	Norway	The barque was driven ashore at Gibraltar with the loss of two of her crew.
Unnamed	Russia	The barque was driven ashore at Algeciras, Spain.
Six unnamed vessels	Flags unknown	Three brigantines and three other vessels were driven ashore on the Spanish coast east of Gibraltar.

== 21 December ==
List of shipwrecks: 21 December 1883
Ship	State	Description
George Gordon	United Kingdom	The ship ran aground on the Furness Bank, in Morecambe Bay. She was refloated with the assistance of the tugs Fylde, Lismore, Walney and Wyre (all United Kingdom) and taken into Piel Island, Lancashire.
Jane and Edward	United Kingdom	The fishing boat foundered in the North Sea with the loss of three of her four crew. The survivor was rescued by the tug Challenger (United Kingdom).

== 22 December ==
List of shipwrecks: 22 December 1883
Ship	State	Description
Bolivia	United Kingdom	The steamship ran aground off Skelmorlie Castle, Ayrshire and was beached. Her passengers were landed. She was on a voyage from Greenock, Renfrewshire to New York, United States.

== 25 December ==
List of shipwrecks: 25 December 1883
Ship	State	Description
Andora Maria	Norway	The schooner collided with the steamship Chadwick (United Kingdom) and sank off Texel, North Holland, Netherlands. Her six crew were rescued.
South of Ireland	United Kingdom	The paddle steamer was wrecked on the Warbarrow Rocks in the English Channel near Lulworth, Dorset.

== 26 December ==
List of shipwrecks: 26 December 1883
Ship	State	Description
Glance	United Kingdom	The smack was driven ashore 2 nautical miles (3.7 km) north of Robin Hoods Bay, Yorkshire.
Hesperia	United Kingdom	The steamship was driven ashore at the Burling Gap, Sussex. She was on a voyage from Calcutta, India to London. She was refloated the next day and resumed her voyage.
Isle of Beauty	United Kingdom	The ship was wrecked at "Baffa", Cyprus. Her crew were rescued.
Limassol Lifeboat	Cyprus	The lifeboat was damaged going to the assistance of vessels in distress at Limassol.

== 27 December ==
List of shipwrecks: 27 December 1883
Ship	State	Description
Gainsborough	United Kingdom	The steamship was run into by the steam collier Wear (United Kingdom and sank in the North Sea 25 nautical miles (46 km) off Spurn Head, Yorkshire. All on board were rescued by Wear. Gainsborough was on a voyage from Hamburg, Germany to Grimsby, Lincolnshire.
Matheran	United Kingdom	The barque was driven ashore and wrecked at Tripoli, Ottoman Tripolitania. Her crew were rescued.
Medallion	United Kingdom	The barque was driven ashore and wrecked at Tripoli. Her crew were rescued.
Olan Nielson	Norway	The abandoned schooner was towed into Grimsby by the smack William (United Kingdom) and a tug.
Risa	United Kingdom	The steamship was driven ashore at Amager, Denmark. She was on a voyage from Danzig, Germany to Ostend, West Flanders, Belgium.
Unnamed	Italy	The brigantine was wrecked at Palermo, Sicily.
Unnamed	Ottoman Empire	The schooner was wrecked at Palermo.

== 28 December ==
List of shipwrecks: 28 December 1883
Ship	State	Description
George W. Stetson	United States	The fishing schooner sank on the Georges Bank in a gale. Lost with all ten crew.
Knutsford	United States	The fishing schooner sank on the Georges Bank in a gale. Lost with all fourteen crew.
Monarch	United Kingdom	The tug struck the Megstone, off the coast of Northumberland and sank. Her crew survived.
Waldo Irving	United States	The fishing schooner sank in a gale on the Georges Bank. Lost with all fourteen crew.
William J. Maddocks	United States	The fishing schooner sank in a gale on the Georges Bank. Lost with all sixteen crew.

== 29 December ==
List of shipwrecks: 29 December 1883
Ship	State	Description
Glengarnock	United Kingdom	The steamship was driven ashore at St. Bees, Cumberland. She was on a voyage from Dublin to Whitehaven, Cumberland. She was refloated with the assistance of a tug.
Liverpool	United Kingdom	The steamship ran aground at Sligo. She was on a voyage from Sligo to Liverpool, Lancashire.

== 31 December ==
List of shipwrecks: 31 December 1883
Ship	State	Description
Aline	Germany	The schooner was run down by a steamship off the East Goodwin Lightship ( Trinity House) with the loss of all but her captain. He was rescued by a smack.
Girdleness	United Kingdom	The steamship collided with the full-rigged ship Sapphire (United Kingdom) in the English Channel 12 nautical miles (22 km) west of Portland, Dorset and was beached. Girdleness was on a voyage from Belfast, County Antrim to London. She was refloated and assisted into Portland by the steamship Rathlin (United Kingdom).

== Unknown date ==
List of shipwrecks: Unknown date in December 1883
Ship	State	Description
Adelaide	United Kingdom	The schooner was abandoned in the North Sea. She was towed into Grimsby, Lincolnshire.
Aimwell	United Kingdom	The schooner was driven ashore at Ballantrae, Ayrshire.
Albatross	(United Kingdom of Great Britain and Ireland) Jersey	The schooner was driven ashore and wrecked near the Turnberry Lighthouse, Ayrshire. She was on a voyage from Gioia Tauro, Italy to Glasgow, Renfrewshire. She was refloated on 27 December and taken into Troon, Ayrshire for repairs.
Alexandria	United States	The steamboat sank in the Mississippi River.
Aline Maria	Italy	The ship was lost at Molfetta. She was on a voyage from Cardiff, Glamorgan, United Kingdom to Molfetta.
Anna	Denmark	The brig was abandoned in the Baltic Sea. Her crew were rescued. She was on a voyage from Helsinki, Grand Duchy of Finland to Copenhagen. She was towed into Liepāja, Russia by the steamship Onega (United Kingdom).
Avendano	Spain	The steamship was wrecked in the Bahamas. She was on a voyage from Liverpool, Lancashire, United Kingdom to Havana, Cuba.
Balthazar	Austria-Hungary	The barque was abandoned in the North Sea. Her crew were rescued. She was on a voyage from Oulu, Grand Duchy of Finland to Bristol, Gloucestershire, United Kingdom.
Benefactress	United Kingdom	The ship was abandoned in the Atlantic Ocean. She was on a voyage from Quebec City, Canada to Greenock, Renfrewshire.
Catharina	Germany	The schooner was abandoned in the North Sea. Her seven crew were rescued by the steamship Catania (Germany.
Comete	United Kingdom	The schooner was driven ashore on Terschelling, Friesland, Netherlands. Her crew were rescued.
Corisande, and Racer	United Kingdom	The ship Corisande was being towed down the Bristol Channel by the tugboat Racer when both ships became wrecks.
Dora	United Kingdom	The smack foundered in the North Sea with the loss of all hands.
Dreadnought	United Kingdom	The ship was driven ashore at San Pietro Clarenza, Sicily, Italy.
Druid	United Kingdom	The steamship ran aground at Port Talbot, Glamorgan.
East	United Kingdom	The ship was driven ashore and wrecked 2 nautical miles (3.7 km) south of Girvan, Ayrshire.
Eleazer	(Russian Empire) Grand Duchy of Finland	The ship was driven ashore and wrecked at "Svea". She was on a voyage from Pori to Hull, Yorkshire, United Kingdom.
Emily Ann	United Kingdom	The schooner ran aground off Skokholm, Pembrokeshire. Her crew were rescued.
Enterprise	United Kingdom	The fishing smack was abandoned in the North Sea. Her crew were rescued by the steam trawler Taurus (United Kingdom).
Florence Louisa	United Kingdom	The ship was wrecked at Havana, Cuba. Her crew were rescued. She was on a voyage from Mexico to a European port.
Geofredo	Spain	The steamship was driven ashore at Santiago de Cuba, Cuba. She was on a voyage from Liverpool to Santiago de Cuba.
George Becker	Germany	The ship ran aground and sank at Warnemünde. She was on a voyage from Newcastle upon Tyne, Northumberland, United Kingdom to Rostock.
Governore Langdon	United Kingdom	The ship struck the quayside at Bootle, Lancashire. She pushed her anchor through her bow and sank. She was on a voyage from Quebec City to Bootle.
Harlsey	United Kingdom	The steamship was driven ashore in the Chesapeake River. She was on a voyage from Marbella, Spain to Baltimore, Maryland, United States.
Harriet Julia	United Kingdom	The ship was driven ashore at Prestwick, Ayrshire. Her crew were rescued.
Henry Gilbert	United Kingdom	The schooner was driven ashore and severely damaged at Whitehaven, Cumberland. Her crew were rescued.
Herman de Ruyter	Netherlands	The full-rigged ship was driven ashore and wrecked on Vlieland, Friesland. Her crew were rescued. She was on a voyage from Riga, Russia to Amsterdam, North Holland.
Hermes	Flag unknown	The brig was driven ashore on Vlieland. She was on a voyage from Riga to Harlingen, Friesland.
Huntsman	United Kingdom	The smack foundered in the North Sea with the loss of all hands.
Idono Alono	France	The brig was driven ashore and wrecked in Bideford Bay. She was on a voyage from Swansea, Glamorgan to Cádiz, Spain.
Ivar	Sweden	The brigantine was driven ashore and wrecked at Thisted, Denmark. She was on a voyage from St. Ubes, Portugal to Gothenburg.
James and Eleanor	United Kingdom	The brig ran aground on Scroby Sands, Norfolk. She was on a voyage from Sunderland, County Durham to Ramsgate, Kent. She was refloated and assisted into Great Yarmouth, Norfolk in a leaky condition.
Jeune Daniel	France	The schooner collided with the steamship Gironde (France) and sank in the Gironde near Bordeaux, Gironde. Her crew were rescued.
John Burbery	United Kingdom	The steamship was driven ashore at Whitehaven. Her crew were rescued.
John Givan	United Kingdom	The brigantine collided with another vessel and was abandoned by her crew. She was towed into Portland, Dorset in a waterlogged condition by the steamship Malaga (United Kingdom).
Juan	United Kingdom	The steamship ran aground in the Gironde. She was on a voyage from Porto, Portugal to Bordeaux. She was refloated and taken into Bordeaux.
Kronborg	Denmark	The barque was driven ashore on Læsø. She was on a voyage from Söderhamn, Sweden to Grimsby. She was refloated and taken into Fredrikshavn.
Lady Hincks	United Kingdom	The barque was driven ashore and wrecked at "Llanaithaiarn", Caernarfonshire. Her crew survived.
Levant	United Kingdom	The steamship struck a sunken rock in the Sound of Islay. She put into Oban, Argyllshire in a leaky condition.
Liverpool	United Kingdom	The full-rigged ship was driven ashore and wrecked at Finart Point, Wigtownshire with the loss of nineteen of her 21 crew. She was on a voyage from Quebec City to Greenock.
London	United Kingdom	The schooner was driven ashore at Filey, Yorkshire. Her crew were rescued by the Scarborough Lifeboat. She was on a voyage from Hartlepool, County Durham to Rye, Sussex.
Madras	United Kingdom	The steamship was driven ashore at "Zwaantjes Droogte", Netherlands East Indies. She was refloated and taken into Surabaya, Netherlands East Indies, where she arrived on 7 December.
Margaret	United Kingdom	The ship was wrecked on the Trinity Sand, in the North Sea off the coast of Lincolnshire. Her four crew were rescued. She was on a voyage from Caernarfon to Newcastle upon Tyne.
Margaret and Ann	United Kingdom	The schooner was abandoned in the Irish Sea. She was discovered by Isabella S., which put some of her crew aboard. They took her into Holyhead, Anglesey.
Marie	United Kingdom	The steam smack foundered in the North Sea with the loss of all hands.
Mariestad	Sweden	The steamship was driven ashore on Öland.
Mizpah	United Kingdom	The fishing sloop was abandoned in the North Sea. Her three crew were rescued by the steamship Catania (Germany).
Monkseaton	United Kingdom	The steamship struck a sunken rock in the River Suir and was beached 3 nautical miles (5.6 km) from Waterford. She was later refloated.
RMS Nile	United Kingdom	The steamship ran aground at Haiti. She was refloated.
New Blessing	United Kingdom	The ship was driven ashore and wrecked at Duart Point, Isle of Mull. Her crew were rescued. She was on a voyage from Bangor, Caernarfonshire to Aberdeen.
Norway	Belgium	The tug struck the quayside and sank at Antwerp.
Papa Erasmo	Italy	The brig was driven ashore in the Seine. She was on a voyage from Rouen, Seine-Inférieure, Frane to Livorno. She was refloated and taken into Havre de Grâce, Seine-Inférieure.
Pipasia	United Kingdom	The schooner ran aground on the Maplin Sands, in the North Sea off the coast of Essex.
Scorpion	United Kingdom	The smack foundered in the North Sea with the loss of all hands.
Selina	United Kingdom	The smack foundered in the North Sea with the loss of all hands.
Shamrock	United Kingdom	The schooner ran aground on the Patrick Rock, at the entrance to the Strangford Lough. She was on a voyage from Drogheda, County Louth to Ayr.
Sjofna	Norway	The steamship was driven ashore at Prøvestenen, Denmark. She was on a voyage from Stockholm, Sweden to Caen, Calvados, France.
Solgran	Norway	The schooner was driven ashore and wrecked at Natal, Brazil.
Stanhope	United Kingdom	The steamship was wrecked on a rock off Rodrigues. Her crew were rescued. She was on a voyage from Mauritius to the English Channel.
Swift	Norway	The brig was driven ashore on Texel, North Holland.
Tar	United Kingdom	The schooner was abandoned in the North Sea. Her seven crew were rescued by the steamship Catania (Germany).
Tay	United Kingdom	The ship struck a rock and sank in the Solway Firth. She was on a voyage from London to Annan, Dumfriesshire.
Theodor	Sweden	The barque was driven ashore on Terschelling. Her crew were rescued. She was on a voyage from Honfleur, Manche, France to a Scottish port.
Thistle	United Kingdom	The Thames barge was run into by the steamship Holmside (United Kingdom) and sank in the River Thames with the loss of one life.
Thomas Campbell	United Kingdom	The ship was driven ashore near Tralee, County Kerry. She was later refloated.
Union	Flag unknown	The steamship was driven ashore. She was on a voyage from "Pernay" to Schiedam, South Holland. She was refloated and taken into Vlieland in a leaky condition.
United	United Kingdom	The brig foundered in the North Sea. Her crew were rescued by the fishing smack James Thorpe (United Kingdom). United was on a voyage from South Shields, county Durham to Maldon, Essex.
Vauban	France	The schooner was driven ashore west of Pwllddu Head, Glamorgan.
Veracity	United Kingdom	The schooner ran aground at Wells-next-the-Sea, Norfolk. She was on a voyage from Hull to Wells-next-the-Sea. She was refloated and found to be severely leaky.
Victoire	United Kingdom	The brigantine was driven ashore at Stranraer, Wigtownshire. She was on a voyage from Belfast, County Antrim to Ayr.
Victoria	Flag unknown	The steamship struck Port Orford Reef and was beached.
Violet	United Kingdom	The ship was abandoned in the North Sea. Her crew were rescued by the fishing smack Queen of the Fleet (United Kingdom). Violet was on a voyage from Newcastle upon Tyne to Topsham, Devon.
Wallands	United Kingdom	The ship was driven ashore. She was on a voyage from Sunderlandto Margate, Kent.
Willie	United Kingdom	The smack ran onto rocks west of Portreath, Cornwall and was wrecked.
Zircon	United Kingdom	The ship departed from Sierra Leone for Liverpool in mid or late December. No further trace, reported overdue.
Unnamed	Italy	The barque was driven ashore north of Workington. Her crew were rescued.
