= George Stetson (schooner) =

Sunken schooner

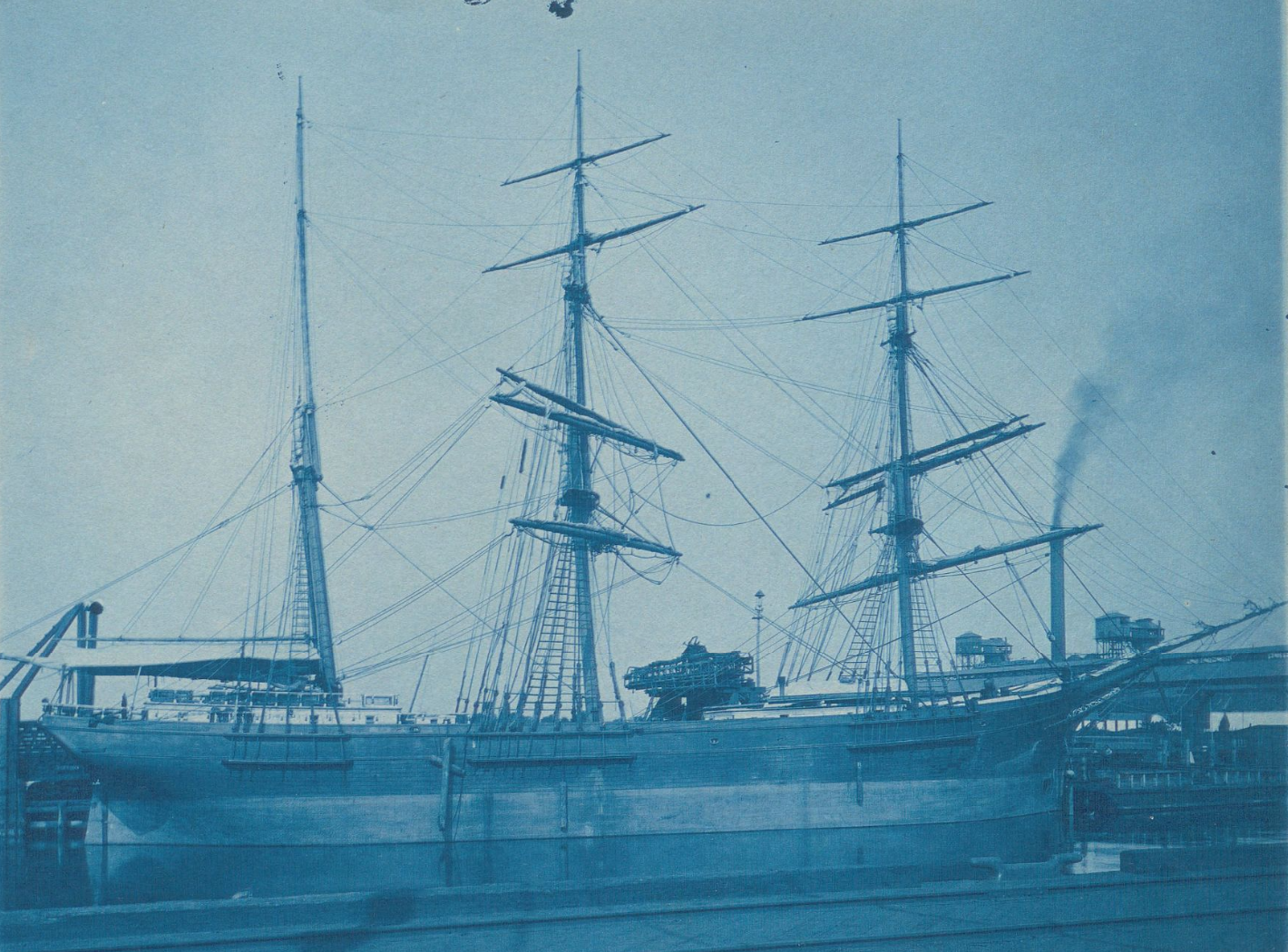
- George Stetson pier side in 1891

History

United States
- Name: George Stetson
- Owner: Parker M. Whitmore
- Builder: Albert Hathorn
- Launched: July 1880
- Homeport: Bath, Maine
- Fate: Destroyed by fire, 1899

General characteristics
- Tonnage: 1845 tons
- Length: 232 ft 9 in (70.94 m)
- Beam: 41 ft 3 in (12.57 m)
- Depth: 26 ft 6 in (8.08 m)

George Stetson was a schooner launched in 1880 and sunk in 1899.

== Design ==
The ship was designed by marine architect Albert Hathorn, who describes the design to be one of his best. The design employed with the Stetson served as the base for the larger 2,205 ton Parker M. Whitmore.

== History ==
The ship was built as a so-called 'Cape Horner' schooner for Parker Whitmore, launched in Bath, Maine in July 1880.

When about 60 miles (97 km) north of Formosa, the ship was destroyed by fire while carrying goods between Portland, Oregon and Taku, China on 27 August 1899. The entire crew was able to evacuate.

== See also ==
Grogan & Company (archived here) - The website hosts a painting of the George Stetson under sail
