= SS Express (1880) =

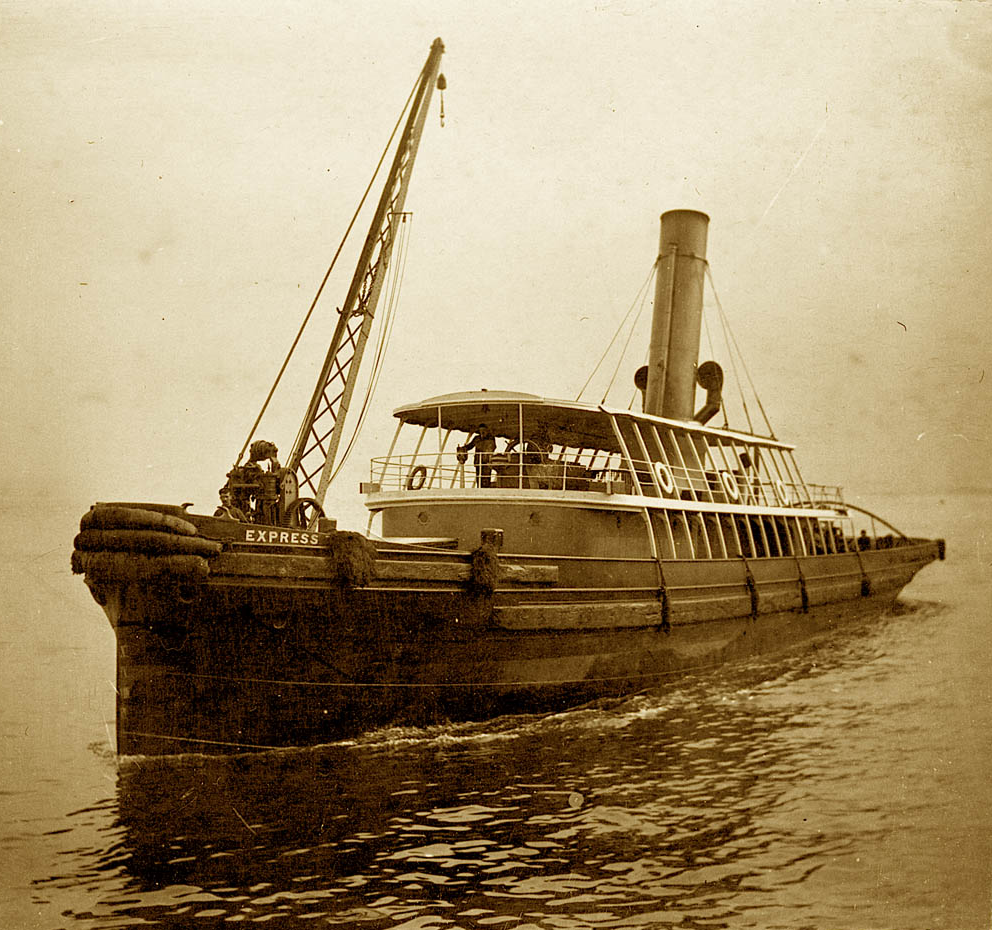
- SS Express on the Clyde

History

United Kingdom
- Name: SS Express
- Owner: Anchor Line (1880-1913)
- Port of registry: Glasgow
- Builder: D&W Henderson, Glasgow
- Yard number: 215
- Laid down: 1880
- Launched: 5 October 1880
- Completed: 15 November 1880
- In service: 15 November 1880
- Out of service: 1913
- Fate: Scrapped in 1913

General characteristics
- Type: Passenger tender
- Tonnage: 309 GRT
- Length: 45.72 metres (150 ft 0 in)
- Beam: 7.65 metres (25 ft 1 in)
- Draught: 2.74 metres (9 ft 0 in)
- Depth: 3.25 metres (10 ft 8 in)
- Installed power: 170
- Propulsion: Twin screw
- Speed: 24 kilometres per hour (13 kn)
- Notes: First twin screw Anchor Line vessel

SS Express was as a tugboat and a passenger tender of the Anchor Line that served on the Clyde from 1880, until her scrapping in 1913.

== Construction ==
The Express was a twin screw tugboat-passenger tender built for the Anchor Line in 1880. She was launched in October, and completed just over a month later. She had only one deck with limited passenger accommodation, and a large crane forward to handle cargoes. Her 46 m (150 ft) long hull was built out of iron, which was still very commonplace. However, she boasted twin screws, which was a rather unique feature that was soon to become the norm as the evolution of shipping continued to pick up in pace.

== Notable incidents ==
- Despite her small size, the career of the Express was rather eventful. On August 27th, 1881, she came to the aid of a burning steamer.
- Later that year on 25 October, her large twin screws fouled a yacht she was towing, causing minor damage.
- Overnight on 2 December 1881, a sailor who stayed on board overnight passed away during the night. He had closed her ventilators in the forecastle, and suffocated.
- On 22 October 1896, the SS City of Rome knocked off the funnel of the Express when the latter was attempting to tug the ocean liner into port.

== Modifications and redundancy ==
With the turn of the century on the rise, the Express underwent various changes throughout her career.

- By 1886, her boiler tubes had been entirely reworked, and the entire boiler had been replaced in 1888, improving her efficiency.
- In 1894, the aging ship had an entire overhaul, which reduced her GRT by 3.

As ocean liners grew in size continuously, the old Express had been replaced in 1913, and she was sold to the Thomas W. Yard in Preston, Lancashire.
