= SS Dora (1880) =

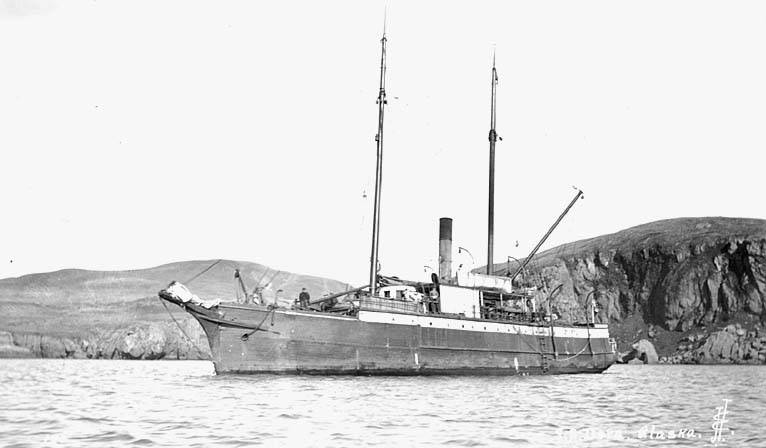

History

United States
- Name: SS Dora
- Operator: Alaska Commercial Company, Alaska Steamship Company, Bering Sea Fisheries Company
- Route: Coastwise trade between Alaska and Washington
- Builder: Matthew Turner, San Francisco, California
- Launched: 7 April 1880
- Fate: Sank 20 December 1920

General characteristics
- Type: Passenger steamship
- Tonnage: 320 GRT
- Length: 112 feet (34 m)
- Beam: 27.2 feet (8.3 m)
- Draught: 13.2 feet (4.0 m)
- Installed power: 80 horsepower (60 kW)
- Propulsion: Compound single-screw engine and full set of sails
- Speed: 7.5 knots (13.9 km/h; 8.6 mph)

The wooden steamship Dora was a passenger and cargo vessel that served the coastal trade in the Territory of Alaska from 1880 to 1920. Built in San Francisco, California, it was active before, during and after the Klondike Gold Rush, and became known as "the bulldog of the North Pacific". After its sinking, a US Fish and Wildlife Service report referred to it as the "most historic vessel plying Alaskan waters."

The Dora was first employed carrying fur seal skins from the Pribilof Islands to California for the Alaska Commercial Company and subsequently became known for its cargo, mail and passenger service to small settlements along the Alaska coast. It frequently rescued the survivors from the wrecks of other vessels in Alaska and endured several near-disasters of its own, including a collision with an iceberg in 1899 and a storm-tossed 1906 voyage that left the ship virtually adrift for 63 days. Its passengers and crew provided one of the earliest firsthand accounts of the 1912 Katmai-Novarupta volcanic eruption. Later that year, a storm in Seward, Alaska ran the Dora aground for three weeks, but the ship was refloated and repaired in Seattle, Washington.

The Dora's 40-year career ended on December 20, 1920, when it ran aground on Noble Island in British Columbia, Canada while traveling from Seattle, to Unga, Territory of Alaska with a cargo of general merchandise and a crew of 29 aboard. The steamship Admiral Rodman rescued 10 members of the Dora's crew and provided first word of the wreck. Two Alaska islands were named after the Dora, one in the Aleutian Islands west of Adak, the other near Seward. A bay in Prince of Wales Island is named after the Dora, as is a lake near the bay. Recreational divers continue to explore the remains of the Dora near Port Hardy, British Columbia.

== Additional reading ==
- Goforth, J. Pennelope. Sailing the Mail in Alaska: The Maritime Years of Alaska Photographer John E. Thwaites, 1905-1912. Anchorage: Cybrrcat Productions, 2003.
