= SS Gainsborough =

British passenger and cargo steamship

History
- Name: SS Gainsborough
- Operator: Manchester, Sheffield and Lincolnshire Railway
- Port of registry: (United Kingdom)
- Builder: Earle's Shipbuilding, Hull
- Launched: 20 December 1880
- Completed: 1881
- Fate: Sunk in collision 27 December 1883

General characteristics
- Tonnage: 1,081 gross register tons (GRT)
- Length: 231.1 feet (70.4 m)
- Beam: 30.3 feet (9.2 m)
- Depth: 15.7 feet (4.8 m)
- Installed power: 900 hp

SS Gainsborough was a passenger and cargo vessel built for the Manchester, Sheffield and Lincolnshire Railway in 1880.

== History ==
Gainsborough was built by Earle's Shipbuilding of Hull, England, and launched on 20 December 1880 christened by Mrs. Bristow, wife of Captain Bristow of the New York liner Romano. She had a large poop fitted with a large saloon and state rooms for 40 first-class passengers, top-gallant forecastle for seamen and firemen, and accommodation for emigrants between decks. She was put on the route between Grimsby, England, and Hamburg, Germany.

On 27 December 1883, having been delayed by fog, she left the mouth of the River Elbe, and when in the North Sea about 25 miles from Spurn Point, Yorkshire, England, was struck amidships by the steam collier Wear, on a voyage from Sunderland to London. Gainsborough was cut down to below the waterline and sank in a few minutes. The passengers and crew of Gainsborough were taken off by Wear, but it was feared that Wear was also sinking so they were transferred to Franklin and taken to London.
