= Mahon (name) =

Mahon is a surname. Notable people with the surname include:

- Alan Mahon (born 1951), Judge of the (Irish) Court of Appeal, formerly Chair of the Mahon Tribunal
- Alan Mahon (born 1978), Irish footballer
- Alex Mahon (born 1973), British broadcaster, CEO of Channel 4
- Alice Mahon (1937–2022), English trade unionist and Labour Party politician
- Barry Mahon (1921–1999), American film director dan producer
- Brendan Mahon (b. 1995), American football player
- Carl Mahon, American actor
- Major Denis Mahon (British Army officer), assassinated in 1847 on or near his estate in County Roscommon, Ireland
- Sir Denis Mahon (1910–2011), British collector and historian of Italian art
- Dennis Mahon (born 1950), American terrorist
- Derek Mahon (1941–2020), Northern Irish poet
- Gavin Mahon (born 1977), professional English football player
- George H. Mahon (1900–1985), American politician
- Hugh Mahon (1857–1931), Irish-born Australian politician
- Jack Mahon, several people
- James Mahon, several people
- John Mahon, several people
- Lauren Mahon (born 1985), British activist
- Mark Mahon, several people
- Patrick Mahon, convicted of the 1924 Crumbles murders
- Pete Mahon (born 1947), Irish football manager
- Peter Mahon (lawyer) (1923–1986), New Zealand barrister
- Peter Mahon (UK politician) (1909–1980), British Labour Party Member of Parliament
- Sam Mahon (born 1954), New Zealander author
- Sean Mahon, Irish stage actor
- Simon Mahon (1914–1986), British Labour Party politician
- Thomas J. Mahon (1882–1927) American politician and jurist
- Tina Mahon (born 1971), British actress
- William Mahon, several people
