= Slieve =

Slieve is an anglicisation of the Irish sliabh (mountain) in the names of various hills and mountains or ranges in the island of Ireland, including

- Slieve Anierin, County Leitrim
- Slieve Aughty, County Galway and County Clare
- Slieve Bawn, County Roscommon
- Slieve Beagh, County Monaghan, County Fermanagh and County Tyrone
- Slieve Bearnagh, County Down
- Slieve Binnian, County Down
- Slieve Bloom, County Laois and County Offaly
- Slieve Carr, County Mayo
- Slieve Coillte, County Wexford
- Slieve Commedagh, County Down
- Slieve Croob, County Down
- Slieve Donard, County Down
- Slieve Felim Mountains, County Limerick and County Tipperary
- Slieve Foy, County Louth
- Slieve Gallion, County Londonderry
- Slieve Gamph, County Sligo
- Slieve Gullion, County Armagh
- Slieve Lamagan, County Down
- Slieve League, County Donegal
- Slieve Meelbeg, County Down
- Slieve Meelmore, County Down
- Slieve Mish Mountains, County Kerry
- Slieve Miskish Mountains, County Cork
- Slieve Muck, County Down
- Slieve-na-Aura, County Antrim
- Slieve na Calliagh, County Meath
- Slievenamon, County Tipperary
- Slieve Rua, County Clare
- Slieve Rushen, County Cavan and County Fermanagh
- Slieve Snaght, County Donegal
- Slieve True, County Antrim

== Ships ==
- PS Slieve Bearnagh, a paddle steamer
- PS Slieve Donard, a paddle steamer
- TSS Slieve Bawn, two twin-screwed steamers
- TSS Slieve Bloom, two twin-screwed steamers
- TSS Slieve Donard, a steam turbine vessel
- TSS Slieve Gallion, a twin-screwed steamer
- TSS Slieve League, a twin screw steamer
- TSS Slievemore, two twin-screwed steamers

== Other uses ==
- Slieve Bloom GAA, a Gaelic Athletic Association hurling club in County Laois, Ireland
- Slieve Bloom Way, a long-distance trail around the Slieve Bloom Mountains
- Slieve Felim Way, a long-distance trail through the Slieve Felim Mountains
- Slieve Gallion (horse), a British Thoroughbred racehorse
