= TSS Slieve Bawn =

TSS Slieve Bawn is the name of the following ships, named for the hill Slieve Bawn in Ireland:

- TSS Slieve Bawn (1905)
- TSS Slieve Bawn (1936)

== See also ==
- Slieve (disambiguation)
