= Strokestown =

Town in County Roscommon, Ireland

Strokestown Béal na mBuillí (Irish)
- Town
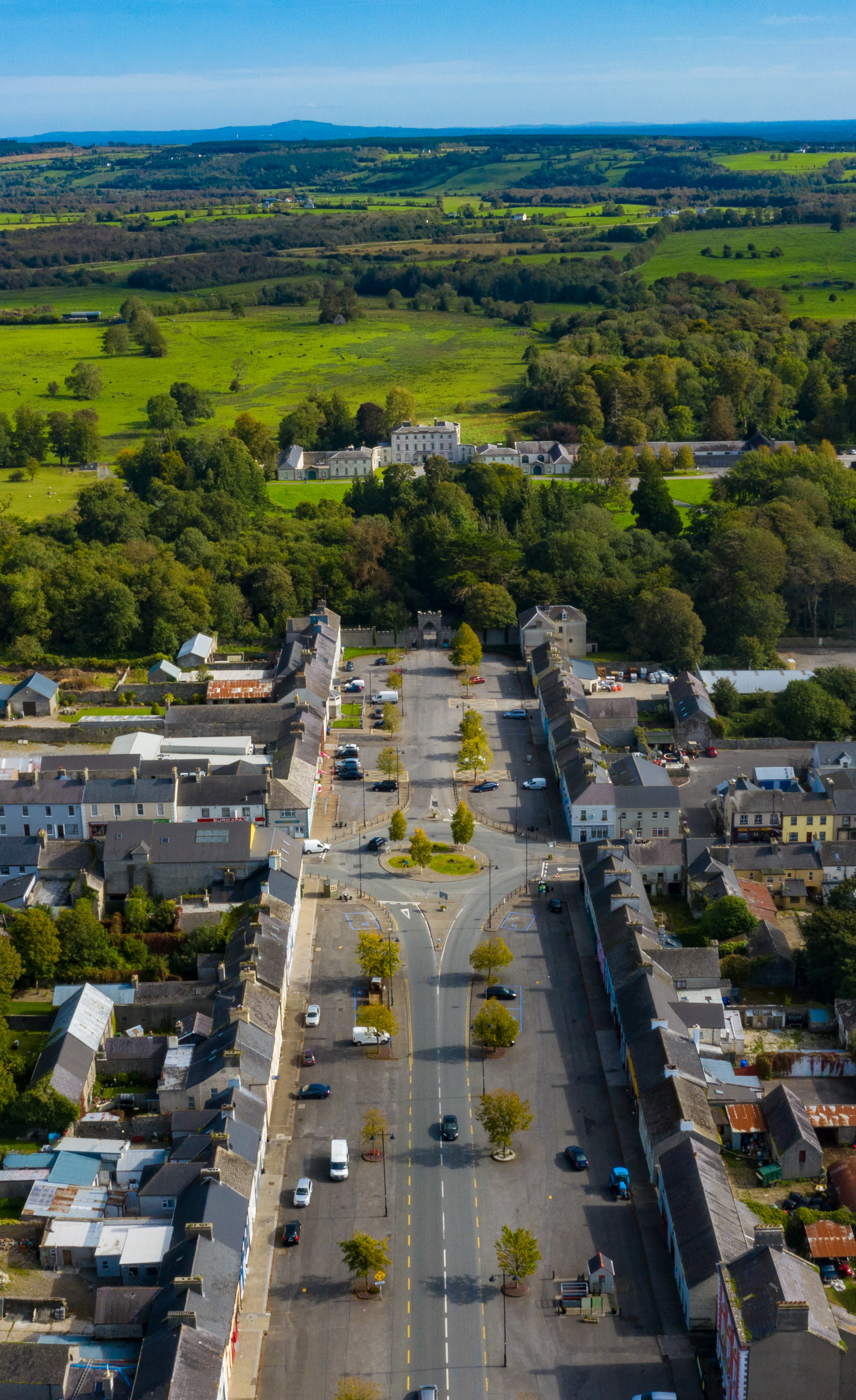
- Second widest street in Ireland

- Location in Ireland
- Coordinates: 53.777°N 8.104°W
- Country: Ireland
- Province: Connacht
- County: County Roscommon
- Elevation: 56 m (184 ft)

Population (2016)
  - Total: 825
- Time zone: UTC±0 (WET)
  - Summer (DST): UTC+1 (IST)
- Eircode routing key: F42
- Telephone area code: +353(0)71
- Irish Grid Reference: M929809
- Website: www.strokestown.ie

Strokestown (Irish: Béal na mBuillí), is a small town in County Roscommon, Ireland. It is one of the 27 designated Heritage Towns in Ireland. Located in the part of the country marketed for tourism purposes as Ireland's Hidden Heartlands, it is 140 km (87 mi) from Dublin and 120 km (75 mi) from Galway. Strokestown is one of Ireland's few planned towns, showing evidence of deliberate planning, such as formally aligned streets and prominent public buildings.

Features include the second-widest street in Ireland which measures 44.5 metres in width, and Strokestown Park House, an 18th-century mansion which is home to the National Famine Museum.

== Name ==
"Strokestown" is a partial translation of the original Irish language name, Béal Atha na mBuillí, which meant "the mouth of the ford of the strokes"; "mouth" referred to the Bumlin River, running through the demesne. According to one theory, "strokes" referred to ancient clan battles that took place in the area; another theory has suggested that "strokes" signified the use of agricultural implements. Béal Atha na mBuillí was usually anglicised as Bellanamully and Bellanamullia.

The name 'Bellanamullia' for Strokestown should not be confused with that of Bellanamullia, a village on the outskirts of Athlone.

The current, official Irish language name of Béal na mBuillí, which was adopted in the 1990s, originated as a version of the original name, reduced in length to fit on road signs.

== History ==
=== Development ===
Strokestown was the site of the estate of the Mahon family, a prominent Anglo-Irish lineage, for over 300 years, from the late 17th century until 1981. As ground landlords, the Mahon family had overall control of the town planning. Founded in 1731 the Dublin Society provided guidance for landlords on a national-scale and it saw mass building and improvements of towns and villages in Ireland during this time, Evidence of landlord-sponsored improvements can be seen in Strokestown, as well as local quirks. The spatial transformation and growth was also influenced by other tenants that invested in the construction of individual buildings. During their sustained landlord patronage the Mahon family relied on these investors to achieve success in the urban project, as it allowed them to split costs while also ensuring a uniform appearance was achieved. The involvement of other tenants ultimately threatened the family's direct input and saw a decrease in landlord influence by the second half of the 19th century.

The town was planned and laid out to centre on a broad avenue leading up to Strokestown Park House. The Mahon carried out regular building projects on the house during their sustained landlord patronage, which, alongside domestic servants, provided a steady source of employment for local people.

The diocesan census for Elphin carried out in the mid-eighteenth century showed the urban growth of Strokestown in comparison to rural neighbouring areas. The town was home to 592 people, living in 146 households, at this time.

=== Famine years ===
On 2 November 1847, Major Denis Mahon, a British Army officer who then held the estate, was assassinated by several local men, in an incident that became well known across Ireland and Britain. The killing was motivated by the eviction of tenant farmers during the Great Famine. However, the killing of Mahon did not halt the evictions; over 11,000 tenants were removed from the estate during the famine period.

The Great Famine is commemorated by the National Famine Museum in Strokestown. Mary Lenahan, of Elphin Street, Strokestown, an ancestor of former Irish President Mary McAleese, was among 16 people recorded in the Strokestown Estate Famine Archive as having received grain meal gratuitously on 23 June 1846. The archive was deposited in November 2008 in the Maynooth Archive and Research Centre in Celbridge, County Kildare.

=== 20th and 21st centuries ===
Starting in 1948, a number of short film segments were shot in the area over a five-year period. These included film of sports days, Corpus Christi processions, weddings, agricultural shows, livestock fairs and FCA and fire brigade training. Strokestown on Film, The Billy Chapman (1902–59) Collection was later released as a DVD of 31 short films of people and events in and around Strokestown.

In the 20 years between the 1991 and 2011 census, the population of Strokestown increased from 568 to 814 people. As of 2016, the town had a population of 825.

== Transport ==
Strokestown is located at the junction of the N5 National primary route and the R368 in the north of County Roscommon. Bus Éireann runs regular bus services to Westport and Dublin. The nearest railway stations are Roscommon (20 km), Carrick-on-Shannon (23 km), Longford (23 km), Boyle (29 km) and Castlerea (30 km). Ireland West Airport is 60 km (37 mi) west of Strokestown via the N5 road (Ireland). The road into the town from the entrance gate of Strokestown Park House is narrow.

== Architecture ==
=== Built heritage ===
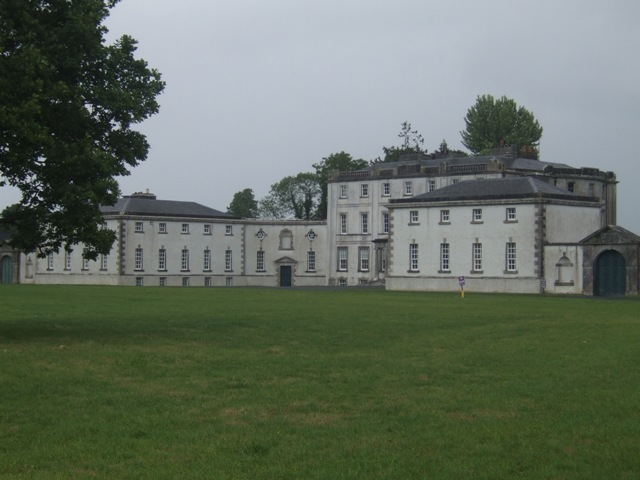
Strokestown House

- Strokestown Park House The Palladian style Strokestown Park House, built c.1740, is met by a winding avenue that begins at a gothic-style entrance at the beginning of the demesne. The house was sold to the Westward Garage Group in 1979, and was subsequently restored. Its stable wing is home to Ireland's first famine museum, opened in May 1994 by then President Mary Robinson. It is still used as a museum.
- Strokestown Park Gates A tripartite gate presents the Strokestown Park estate to the town laid out between 1810 and 1815 by Maurice Mahon. At almost one hundred and fifty feet wide, the main thoroughfare, leading up to the gates of the estate, was said to be the widest in Ireland at the time. The crow-stepped battlements belong to the "picturesque" style, in contrast to the restrained Classicism of the house.
- Church of the Immaculate Conception, Elphin Street - This Roman Catholic church was built between 1860 and 1863 on the site of an earlier structure, and was opened and blessed on 14 May 1863. It was built under the guidance of Fr Michael McDermott who was parish priest here from 1835 until his death. There is a plaque dedicated to him inside the church. The church was extensively modified in 1959/60. The church roof was lowered and two new bays were added to provide additional seating. The large scale renovation and extension of the church retained the altar, reredos and stained glass put in place by the original architect.
- St. John's Church of Ireland, Church Street - This former Church of Ireland church was built in the 1820s, on the site of an earlier church dating from the eighteenth-century. The octagonal-shaped gothic church terminated function as a place of worship in the 1970s and is now home to the County Roscommon Heritage & Genealogy Centre.
- St Mary's Catholic Church, Carniska - The church was built in 1840/1841 and partly rebuilt and remodelled in 1909/1910 and in 1954/1955. Local stonemasons built the walls using stones quarried from nearby. Prior to this the place of worship for the area was celebrated in a barn situated on the site where the old and former Carniska School of 1841 existed. This barn was acquired and converted into a thatched chapel. Its roof was blown off during the hurricane of 1839 and the Rev. John Boyd decided to have a new church build.
- The Magnet Ballroom, Elphin Street - "The Ballroom" opened on Easter Sunday, 26 April 1936. The opening performance was from the Strokestown Dramatic Group. Dance bands performed here over the years, attracting couples from far and wide having been one of the few ballrooms in the vicinity. In 1950, a competition was held for a name for the hall, and after many entries "The Magnet" was chosen. The ballroom closed in the late 1970s. In 1989, it was bought by Walsh Mushrooms and was used as a mushroom farm until 2003.

=== Derelict buildings ===
As of 2021, a number of buildings on the main street in Strokestown lie vacant, representing (according to a 2021 Irish Times article) "architectural evidence of Strokestown’s decline". The growing number of derelict buildings has had a significant impact on Strokestown's streetscape. The town, which was once home to three department stores as well as three bank branches, is now home to none, with the last bank branch closing its doors in October 2021. The once "bustling weekly market" at the old Market House now houses just four stalls.

== Education ==
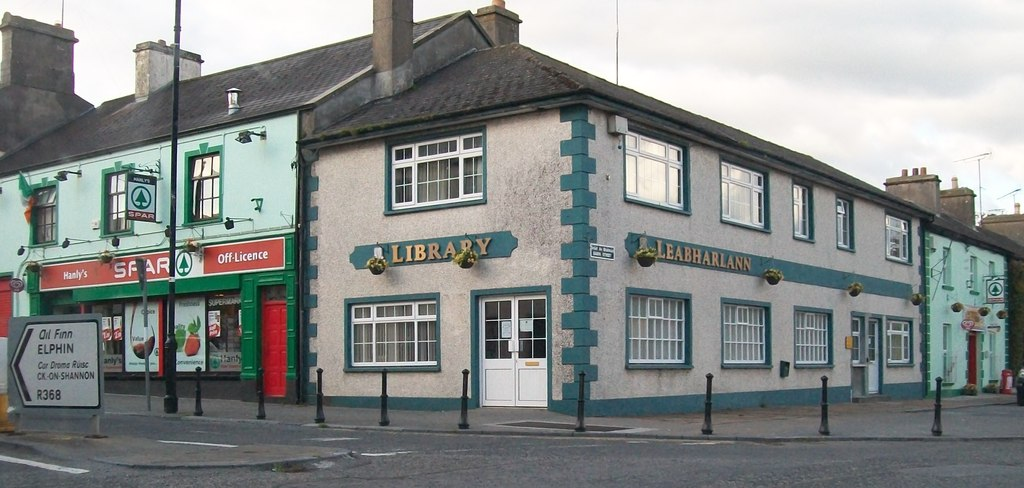
Strokestown Library

Strokestown has two primary schools, St Mary's Primary and St Patrick Boys' School, and one secondary school, Scoil Mhuire. There are also two other primary schools in the parish of Strokestown, Kiltrustan National School (5 km north of the town) and Clooncagh National School (7 km south). As of 2021, Scoil Mhuire secondary school had approximately 600 students, and offered transition year, Leaving Certificate Applied classes, and Junior Certificate and Leaving Certificate state examinations. Strokestown Library is located in the town centre. Strokestown provides a community playschool and afterschool, offering care to kids between the age 2–12. Finally it provides a further education centre. The further education centre does not require any previous education. It provides training for modern offices, allowing candidates to seek education in this area.

== Places of interest ==
Lisonuffy Graveyard is located 5 km southeast of Strokestown. The ruins of a 12th-century abbey are situated in the graveyard containing a pointed window and doorway. This was the site of a Christian settlement and was also in O'Connor Roe territory, descendants of an Irish noble house who were one of the most influential royal houses in Ireland. In 1734, a slab of marble sent from Italy was set into a wall of the Abbey ruins as a memorial to members of the O’Connor Roe family. The graveyard enclosing wall was built and complete by 1825.

Kiltrustan Cemetery is located 5.5 km north of Strokestown. The ruins of an 11th-century medieval church are situated in the cemetery. A wooden chapel was once erected in the cemetery grounds in 1805 by Rev. James Kelly. This was later replaced by the present church in Kiltrustan in the early 1850s. There are three vaults in the graveyard namely Donnellan, Shanley and McMahon. The grave slabs of two priests have been uncovered and the oldest headstone dates to 1717.

There are 14 lakes in the area, collectively known as the 'Strokestown Lakes'.

== Sport ==
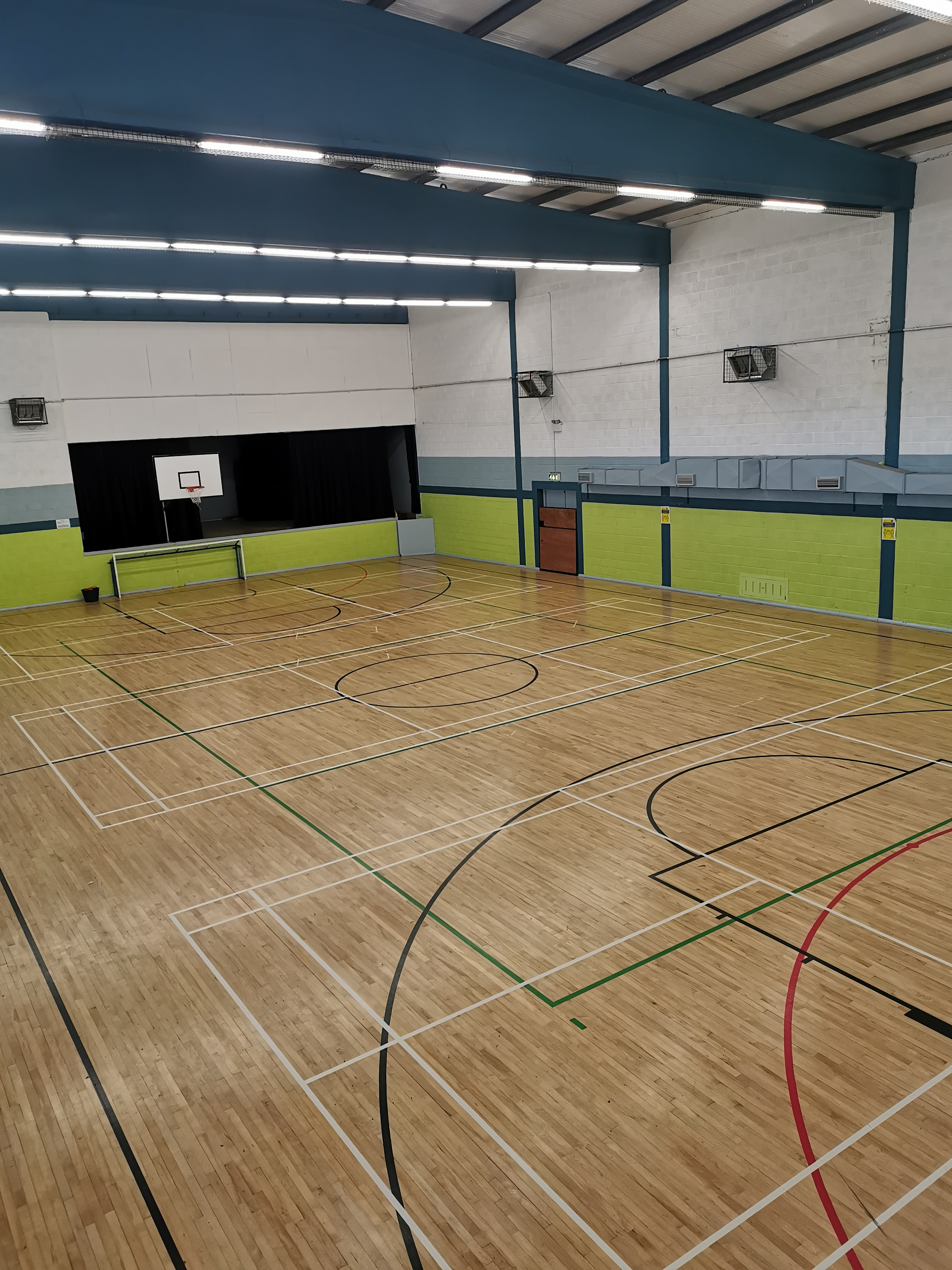
Community hall

Strokestown GAA is a Gaelic games club based in the town. It was founded in 1881 during a meeting in Duffy's Hotel. A GAA pitch can be found at the top of Strokestown, surrounded by the local schools, the community centre and a soccer pitch. The club is seen as a successful club, recently winning the Roscommon County Senior Football Final in October 2022. Other local sports clubs include Kiltrustan Sports Club, which was established in 1979. In 2018 a new synthetic grass court was laid, and a walkway created around a newly reseeded pitch. Work was later commenced on lighting up the walkway.

Strokestown Golf Club is a 9-hole golf course located on the N5, approximately 2 km east of Strokestown. The club was formed in 1995 and in 2001 moved to its present location in Bumlin.

Community-based sports facilities and amenities include the Strokestown Community & Sports Centre. This centre was built in 1980, and is used as a venue for indoor sports such as soccer, basketball, badminton, boxing and community games. The centre is also host to dancing championships, CCÉ Fleadhs, and other community events. The Strokestown Community Playground has been open since 2015 and is located on Boreen Road, off Church Street.

== See also ==
- List of towns and villages in Ireland
- Market Houses in Ireland
- Scramogue Ambush
- Slieve Bawn
