= William Mahon =

William Mahon may refer to:

- Sir William Mahon, 4th Baronet (1813–1893), of the Mahon baronets
- Sir William Mahon, 5th Baronet (1856–1926), of the Mahon baronets
- William D. Mahon (1861–1949), former coal miner who became president of the Amalgamated Association of Street Railway Employees of America
- Sir William Mahon, 7th Baronet (born 1940), British Army officer

== See also ==
- William Mahone (1826–1895), member of the Virginia General Assembly and U.S. Congress
