= Murrintown =

Village in County Wexford, Ireland

Murrintown Irish: Baile Mhúráin
- Village
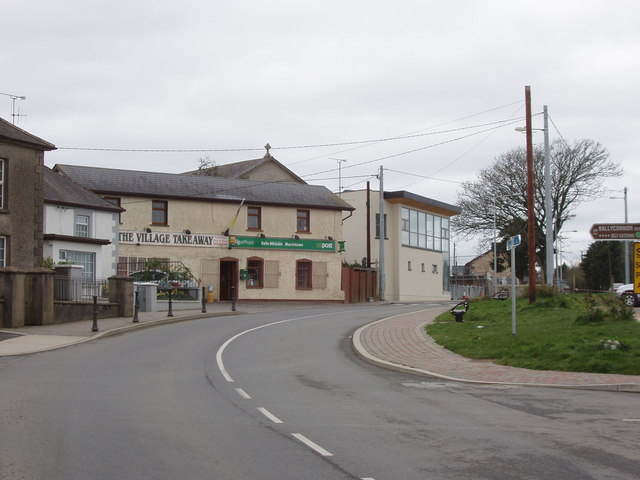
- Murrintown post office

- Location in Ireland
- Coordinates: 52°16′52″N 6°31′12″W
- Country: Ireland
- Province: Leinster
- County: Wexford

Population (2022)
  - Total: 342
- Time zone: UTC+0 (WET)
  - Summer (DST): UTC-1 (IST (WEST))
- Area code: 053 91

Murrintown (Irish: Baile Mhúráin), also spelled Murntown, is a small village in the southeast of County Wexford, Ireland, close to Wexford town. It is part of the ecclesiastical parish of Piercestown and lies in the civil parish of Kildavin.

The village contains a pub, primary school, Roman Catholic church, a large community centre, a shop and a childcare centre. A new cemetery opened in February 2018.

== History and development ==
The village and its environs contain a number of buildings dating from the 18th century, several of which are farmhouses. Murrintown House is now a dwelling but in the past has been both a hostelry and a shop. As a hostelry, it was frequented by soldiers during the 1798 rebellion. Beechwood is a Georgian-era estate house sitting on 50 acres of woodland, with various farm buildings. This too played a role in 1798. After having been unoccupied for several years, it was sold in 2017 and the new owners have embarked on a restoration programme.

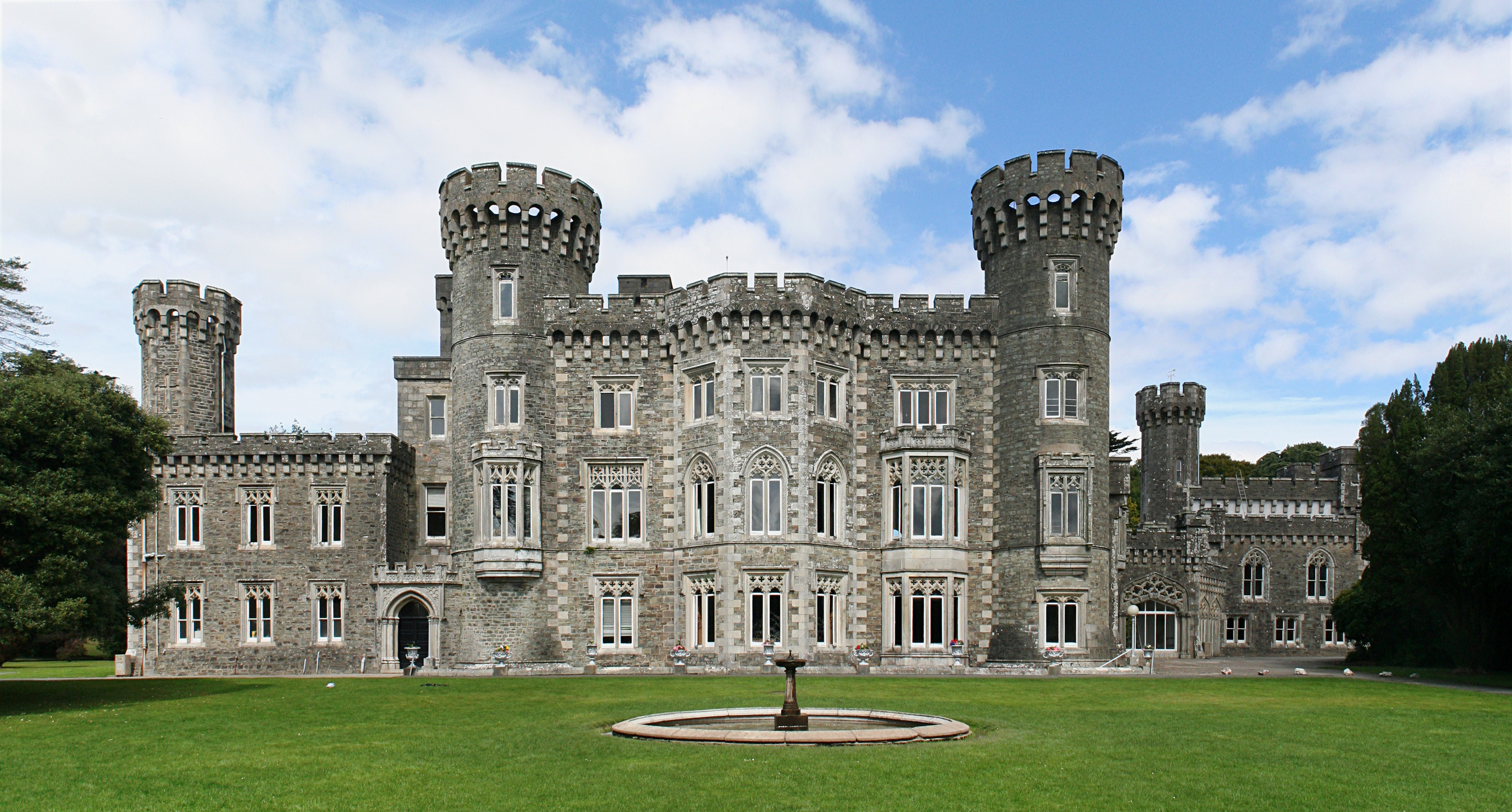
Johnstown Castle

The village is bordered by the Johnstown Castle estate, containing a large Victorian revival castle built for the Grogan-Morgan family in the early 19th century. It contains a mature woodland and three lakes, the largest covering approximately 14 acres (57,000 m^{2}). The property was presented as a gift to the Irish state in 1945 and was later occupied by the Department of Agriculture who established an agricultural institute here and undertook to maintain, but not to alter, the ornamental grounds. Teagasc is now responsible for the overall running of the estate. The grounds house the headquarters buildings of both the Environmental Protection Agency and the Department of Agriculture, Food and the Marine. The early 19th century farm buildings house the Irish Agricultural Museum.

== Sport ==
The village is home to Forth Celtic Football Club, and the Piercestown village hosts Johnstown Castle Football Club and St. Martin's GAA club.

== Transport ==
The Wexford Bus route from Kilmore Quay to Wexford serves the village several times a day from Monday to Sunday. Bus Éireann also operated route 383 between these locations on Saturdays and Tuesdays (via route 381) to Carrick-on-Bannow but the Bus Eireann services were cut in 2026.

== See also ==
- List of towns and villages in Ireland
