= Scramoge ambush =

Ambush carried out by the IRA in 1921

- Part of the Irish War of Independence
Date	23 March 1921
Location	Scramoge, County Roscommon, Ireland 53.765°N 8.064°W
Result	IRA victory: Successful Irish ambush and getaway

Belligerents
Irish Republican Army	(United Kingdom of Great Britain and Ireland) British Army (United Kingdom of Great Britain and Ireland) Royal Irish Constabulary

Commanders and leaders
Patrick Madden	(United Kingdom of Great Britain and Ireland) Roger Greenville Peeke

Strength
39	9

Casualties and losses
None	4 killed in action, 2 captured and later killed
- 1 IRA volunteer killed and 3 captured in sweeps after the ambush
- Location within island of Ireland

The Scramoge ambush was an ambush carried out by the Irish Republican Army (IRA) on 23 March 1921, during the Irish War of Independence. The IRA ambushed a lorry carrying British troops and Royal Irish Constabulary (RIC) officers at Scramoge, near Strokestown in County Roscommon. Three British soldiers and an RIC officer were killed, while two RIC 'Black and Tans' were captured and shot dead shortly after.

Following the ambush, the British carried out a sweep in which they captured three of the IRA volunteers involved, and killed another who had not taken part.

== Background ==
County Roscommon was not one of the more violent areas of Ireland during the conflict. The local IRA argued to their GHQ that it was very difficult to conduct guerrilla warfare in the flat open countryside there. Prior to the action at Scramogue, the biggest previous incident had been in October 1920, when four RIC officers were killed in an ambush near Ballinderry.

Sean Connolly had been sent by IRA GHQ from Longford to re-organise the Roscommon IRA and had chosen the ambush site at Scramoge (also spelt Scramogue). However, he was killed twelve days before the action, at the Selton Hill ambush in neighbouring County Leitrim.

=== Preparing the ambush ===
Both the North and South Roscommon brigades of the IRA took part, and were commanded by Patrick Madden. There were 39 volunteers in the flying column, but only 14 took part in the actual attack; the remainder were tasked with blocking roads to keep the IRA's line of retreat open. The IRA party was armed with 13 rifles (11 Lee–Enfields, 1 Winchester and 1 sporting rifle), 20 shotguns (though some of them in bad condition) and two or three Webley revolvers. This was the largest collection of arms that the IRA had assembled in Roscommon during the war and some of them had been borrowed from IRA units in Longford.

Among the volunteers who took part were Martin Fallon, 'Cushy' Hughes, Frank Simons, Luke Duffy, Peter Casey, Peter Collins, Patrick Gallagher and Tom Compton. Several of the IRA men, including Hughes, had served in the Irish Guards in the First World War, but had been persuaded by Pat Madden to join the IRA on their return.

The ambush site was carefully prepared. It was located at a sharp bend on the Strokestown–Longford road. A farmhouse and barn at the bend had been taken over and loopholed, and a trench was dug behind a hedge alongside the road. Only a mile from the IRA's position, the British 9th Lancers regiment was garrisoned in Strokestown House.

== The ambush ==
The IRA waited in their position in the morning for British forces to come from Strokestown. Just as a troop lorry finally appeared, two civilians came up the road in a pony and trap and had to be frantically waved out of the way.

The lorry carried a nine-man British Army and Royal Irish Constabulary (RIC) patrol travelling on the Strokestown–Longford road. The British inquiry into the incident was to question why the lorry was unescorted, as their practice was not to travel in lone vehicles.

The IRA opened fire from very close range, killing the driver and halting the lorry in its tracks. Several of the soldiers and policemen were hit and they scrambled for cover behind a wall along the road. The lorry had a Hotchkiss machine gun, bolted onto it, but its gunner got off only one burst before being badly wounded and the gun put out of action. The commander of the patrol, Captain Roger Grenville Peek, was hit in the lorry but tried to run to safety, only to be hit again 400 yards down the road and killed. The other officer with the party, Lieutenant Tennant, was also killed by a shotgun blast. After the death of the two officers, the surviving British, several of whom were wounded, surrendered.

Just as the firing was dying-down, another lorry—an RIC/Black and Tan patrol—approached the ambush site but turned back after coming under fire.

Four of the British force were killed – this included two British Army officers (Roger Grenville Peek and John Harold Anthony Tennant), an RASC driver, and one RIC man (Constable Edward Leslie).

Two men in civilian clothes were also found in the lorry. They turned out to be Black and Tans who had been placed under arrest by the soldiers (Constable Buchanan and Constable Evans) – they were made prisoners by the IRA. The ambush party took the British arms (including the Hotchkiss gun), burned the lorry and made their escape over the hill of Slieve Bawn.

== Aftermath ==
The IRA leaders—Pat Madden, Luke Duffy and Frank Simons—decided to kill the two Black and Tans, despite their offering to show the IRA how to use the captured machine gun. The IRA officer reasoned that if the prisoners identified the IRA men who had taken part in the ambush, the volunteers would be at risk of being executed if captured. The two were taken to remote locations and shot over the next two days.

The British garrison in Roscommon town mounted a sweep directly after the ambush with eight lorries and one Whippet tank. Three volunteers who had taken part were arrested afterward. Pat Mullooly and Brian Nagle of the North Roscommon Brigade were arrested, as they tried to get away from the scene of the ambush, as was "Cushy" Hughes, who was picked up when he was drawing his soldier's pension in Roscommon. Mullooly and Nagle were badly beaten by their captors on the road to Roscommon. The next day, another volunteer, Michael Mullooly (brother of Pat) was shot dead in his home by the RIC.
