= Strokestown Park =

18th-century house in County Roscommon, Ireland

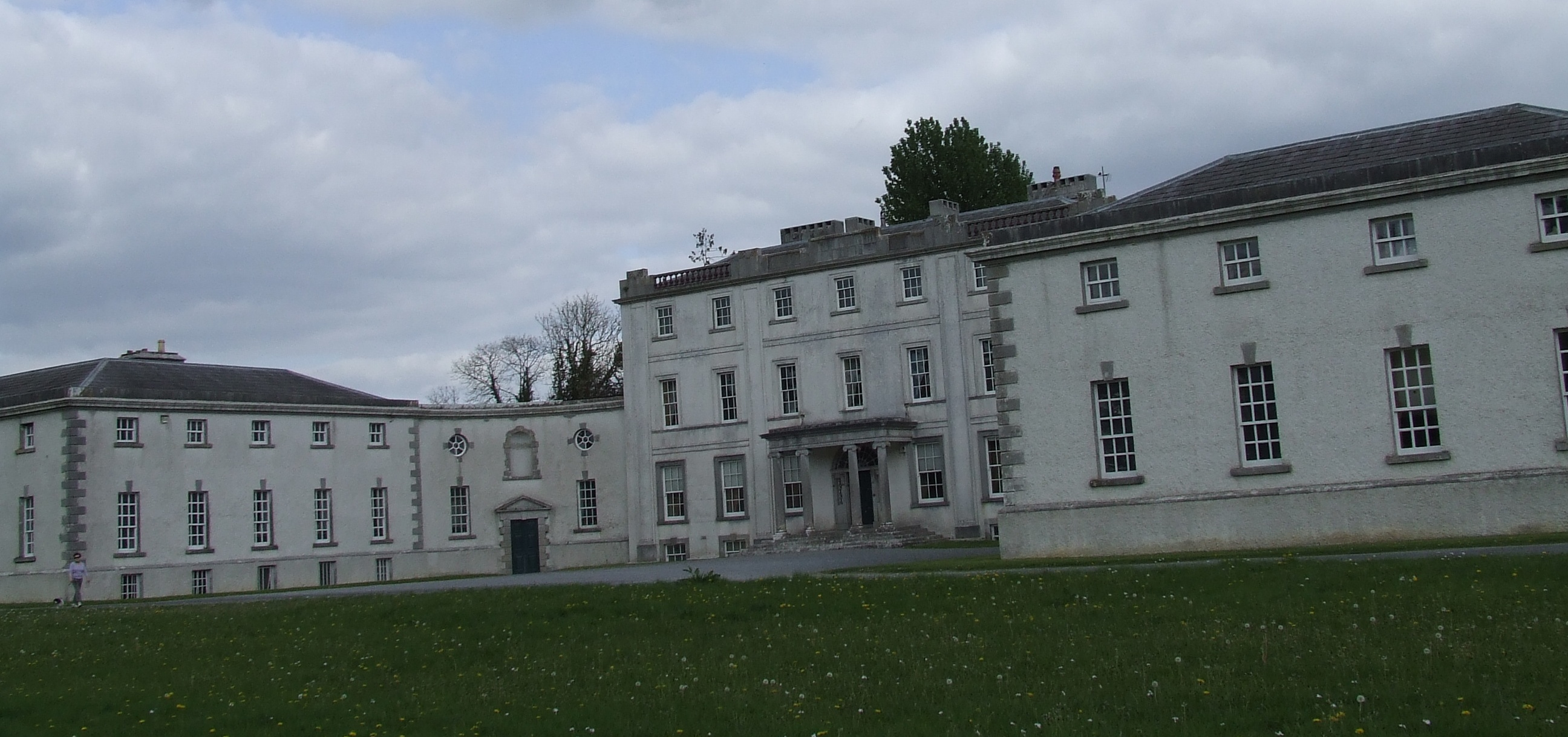
- Strokestown Park House in 2011

- Location within Ireland

General information
- Architectural style: Palladian
- Location: Strokestown, Ireland
- Coordinates: 53.777°N 8.104°W
- Current tenants: National Famine Museum
- Completed: 1730
- Renovated: 1820 (portico added)

Technical details
- Material: limestone

Design and construction
- Architect: Richard Cassels
- Developer: Thomas Mahon MP (1701-82)

Strokestown Park is a Palladian style Georgian house in Strokestown, County Roscommon, Ireland, set on about 300 acres (120 ha).

Strokestown Park is cared for and managed by the Irish Heritage Trust, an Irish non-profit, while local company Westward Holdings remains in ownership. Strokestown Park is home of the award-winning National Famine Museum.

== History ==
The estate served as the home to the Mahons, a well-known military family, from the 1600s until 1981. Captain Nicholas Mahon was the first to be granted around 2,700 acres in the Barony of Roscommon in February 1666 while he was later granted over 3,000 acres in the baronies of Roscommon and Ballintober in July 1678. The later grant was originally in the possession of the O'Conor Roe and became the Strokestown estate.

In 1696, a house appeared to have been completed by John Mahon which had earlier been started by his father Captain Nicholas Mahon. This was likely built on top of a ruinous sixteenth century castle structure which was said to have been destroyed in 1552 by Mac Diarmada.

By the early 18th century, the estate comprised over 11,000 acres (4,500 ha), scattered throughout northeast County Roscommon. Later, his great-grandson, Maurice Mahon, purchased several additional lands, following elevation to the Peerage of Ireland as the first Baron Hartland in 1800.

The present house was likely constructed around 1735,possibly on the occasion of Thomas Mahon's marriage to Jane Crosby. Built to a design attributed to the architect Richard Castle, It incorporates part of the earlier 1696 structure. Over the years an extra floor was added to the top of the house and later again a portico and regency library were added, around 1820.

=== Great Famine ===
Many evictions of poor tenant farmers occurred during the Great Famine. The Mahon family alone in 1847 evicted 3,000 people. After the killing of Major Denis Mahon in November 1847, as a direct reaction to the large scale deaths of those sent on famine ships to Canada by the Strokestown estate at the height of the Famine, his only daughter, Grace Catherine, vowed never to return to her ancestral seat. She was on honeymoon at the time, having been married only weeks earlier, to Henry Sandford Pakenham, son of Dean Henry Pakenham of Tullynally, and heir to the vast Pakenham and Sandford estates in counties Longford, Westmeath and Roscommon. Grace Catherine never returned to Strokestown, but her marriage undoubtedly saved the estate from bankruptcy. On the eve of the Famine, the estate was in debt with over £30,000 having accrued as a result of family dispute over inheritance and expensive land purchases which had gathered from the second half of the eighteenth century. The marriage alliance (by which Henry Sandford Pakenham assumed the additional surname of Mahon), united the estates of both families to comprise over 26,000 acres, and the Strokestown estate remained one of the largest in County Roscommon until his death in 1893. The Pakenham fortune also enabled large scale investment in various estate improvement projects on the Strokestown estate, including drainage, turf cutting and agricultural schemes, development of the urban market in the town of Strokestown. However, despite the family fortunes improving, Strokestown continued a policy of assisted emigration to Canada and land clearances of tenant families.

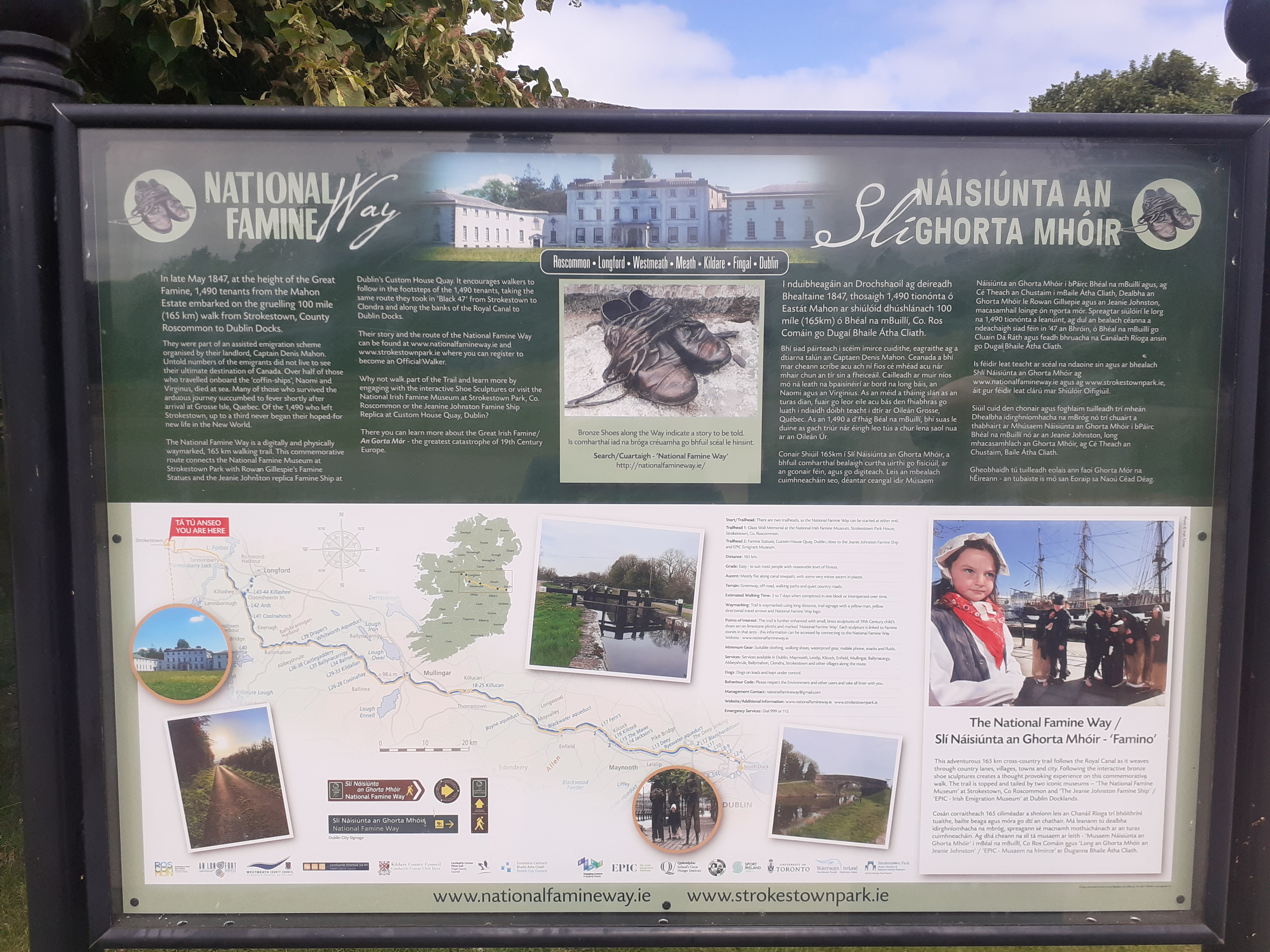
Bilingual information point at the start of the National Famine Way in Strokestown Park

=== 20th century ===
In 1911 and 1912, over 8,600 acres were vested in the Congested Districts Board for Ireland in order to alleviate poverty by redistributing and making more efficient use of agricultural land.

In 1979, a local man, whose family's history dates back to the Irish Famine in the locality purchased the Estate when the last of the Mahon family, Olive Pakenham Mahon, left the house in 1981 and moved to England where she died 2 months later.

== Restoration ==
In 1997, the 4-acre (1.6 ha) walled pleasure garden was officially opened by the then President of Ireland, Mary Robinson, having been faithfully restored.

In 2013, Strokestown Park was the setting for TV3's documentary, The Big House.

In 2016 The Irish Heritage Trust took over the care and management of Strokestown Park.

In 2022, the National Famine Museum and Palladian House were reopened after extensive restoration by The Irish Heritage Trust. The whole estate, while still privately owned, is cared for and managed by the Irish Heritage Trust, a nonprofit charity.

=== National Famine Museum ===
The Strokestown estate houses the Irish National Famine Museum which contains some of the best records from the time of the Great Famine. The museum was built by the Westward Group and all the documents on display are from the estate. The exhibit aims to explain the Great Famine and to draw parallels with the occurrence of famine elsewhere in the world today.
