= USS Stockton (DD-73) =

Caldwell-class destroyer

Coordinates: 56°03′N 0°45′W

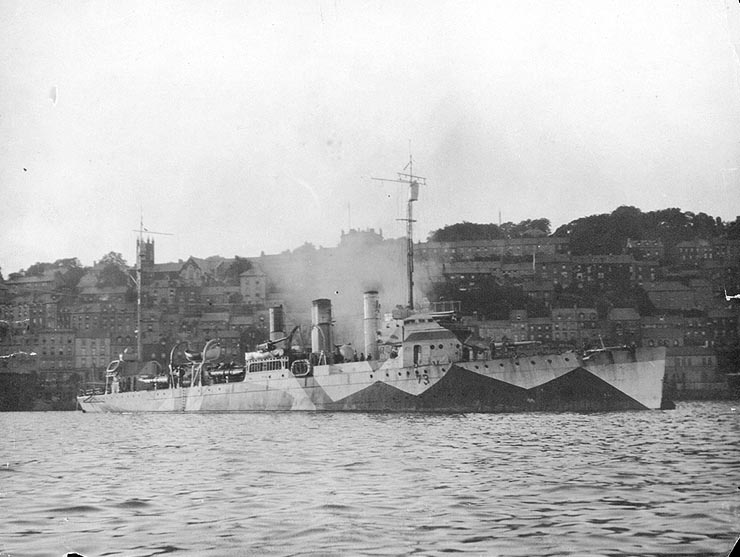
- USS Stockton, circa 1918

History

United States
- Name: USS Stockton
- Builder: William Cramp & Sons, Philadelphia
- Yard number: 437
- Laid down: 16 October 1916
- Launched: 17 July 1917
- Commissioned: 26 November 1917
- Decommissioned: 26 June 1922
- Recommissioned: 16 August 1940
- Decommissioned: 23 October 1940
- Stricken: 8 January 1941
- Identification: DD-73
- Fate: Transferred to Royal Navy 23 October 1940

United Kingdom
- Name: HMS Ludlow
- Acquired: 23 October 1940
- Decommissioned: June 1945
- Fate: Beached 15 July 1945; Destroyed as target

General characteristics
- Class & type: Caldwell-class destroyer
- Displacement: 1,020 tons (standard); 1,125 tons (normal)
- Length: 315 ft 6 in (96.16 m)
- Beam: 31 ft 4 in (9.55 m)
- Draft: 8 ft 1 in (2.46 m)
- Propulsion: White-Forster boilers; Parsons turbines; three shafts; 18,500 hp (13,800 kW)
- Speed: 30 knots (56 km/h; 35 mph)
- Complement: 128 officers and enlisted
- Armament: 4 × 4 in (100 mm) 21-pdr guns; 1 × 6 in (152 mm) Y-gun; 12 × 21 inch (533 mm) torpedo tubes

USS Stockton (DD-73), a Caldwell-class destroyer, in commission in the United States Navy from 1917 to 1922 — seeing service in World War I — and briefly during 1940. She later served in the Royal Navy as HMS Ludlow during World War II. She was the second U.S. Navy ship named for Commodore Robert F. Stockton (1795–1866).

== Construction and commissioning ==
Stockton was laid down on 16 October 1916 by William Cramp & Sons at Philadelphia, Pennsylvania, and launched on 17 July 1917, sponsored by Ellen Emelie De Martelly. She was commissioned on 26 November 1917.

== Service history ==
=== United States Navy ===
Stockton spent the last year of World War I assigned to convoy escort and antisubmarine warfare duty, operating from Queenstown (now Cobh), Ireland. During that time, she engaged an Imperial German Navy U-boat on at least one occasion. On 30 March 1918, she and the destroyer Ericsson were escorting the troopship St. Paul on the Queenstown-Liverpool circuit, when Ericsson opened fire on a German submarine. The submerged submarine launched a torpedo at Stockton almost immediately thereafter, and the destroyer narrowly evaded it. The two destroyers dropped patterns of depth charges, but the U-boat managed to evade their attack and escaped. Later that night, Stockton collided with the ferry Slieve Bloom near South Stack Light. Slieve Bloom sank on 31 March 1918 with the loss of one life, and Stockton had to put into Liverpool for repairs.

Stockton returned to the United States in 1919, and continued to serve with the fleet for the next three years. On 26 June 1922, she was decommissioned and laid up at Philadelphia.

Stockton was recommissioned on 16 August 1940 and proceeded to Halifax, Nova Scotia, Canada, where she was decommissioned on 23 August 1940 and turned over to the United Kingdom under the provisions of the Destroyers for Bases Agreement.

Stocktonʼs name was struck from the U.S. Naval Vessel Register on 8 January 1941.

=== Royal Navy ===
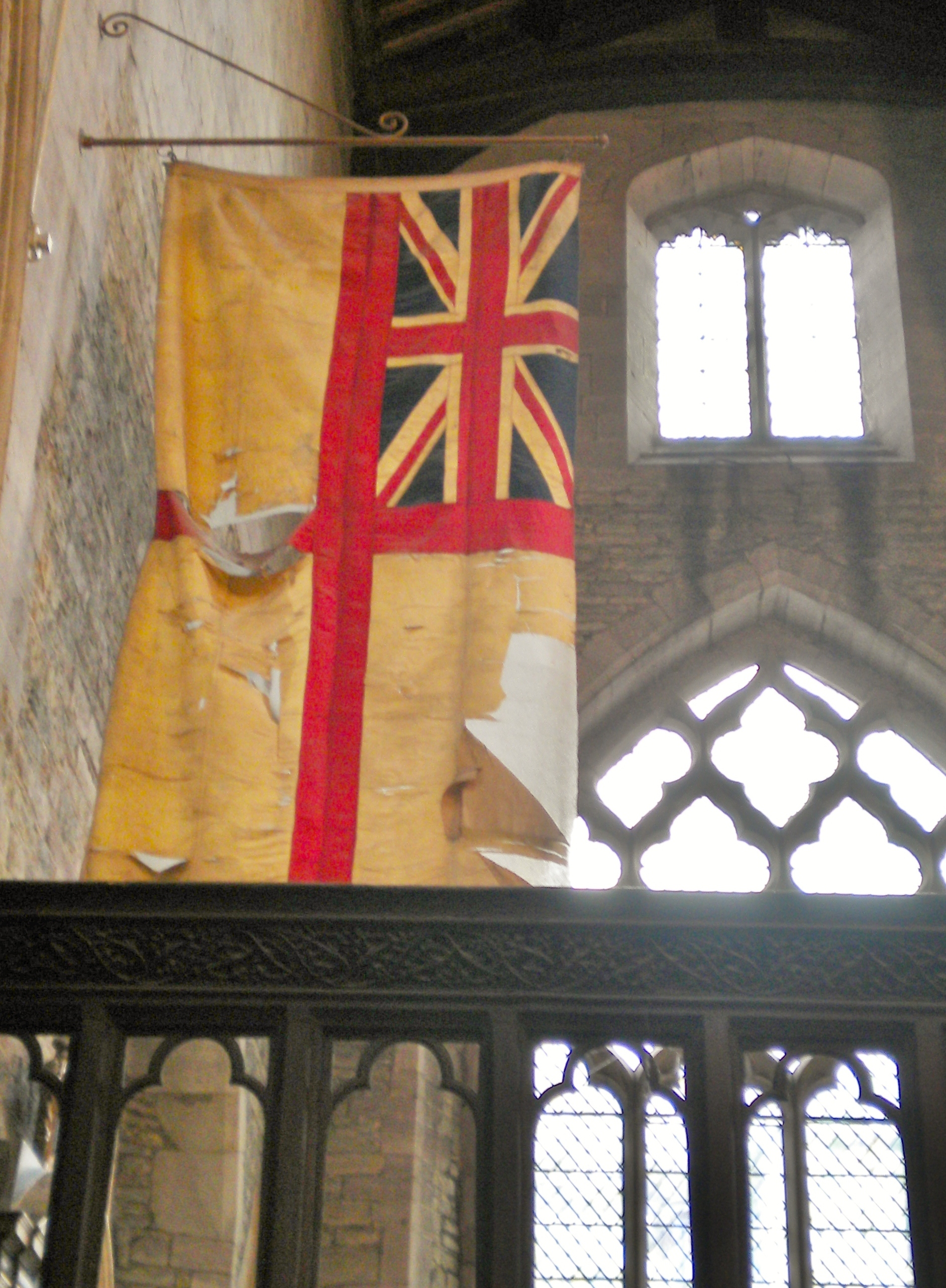
Ludlowʼs ensign on display in St Laurence, Ludlow

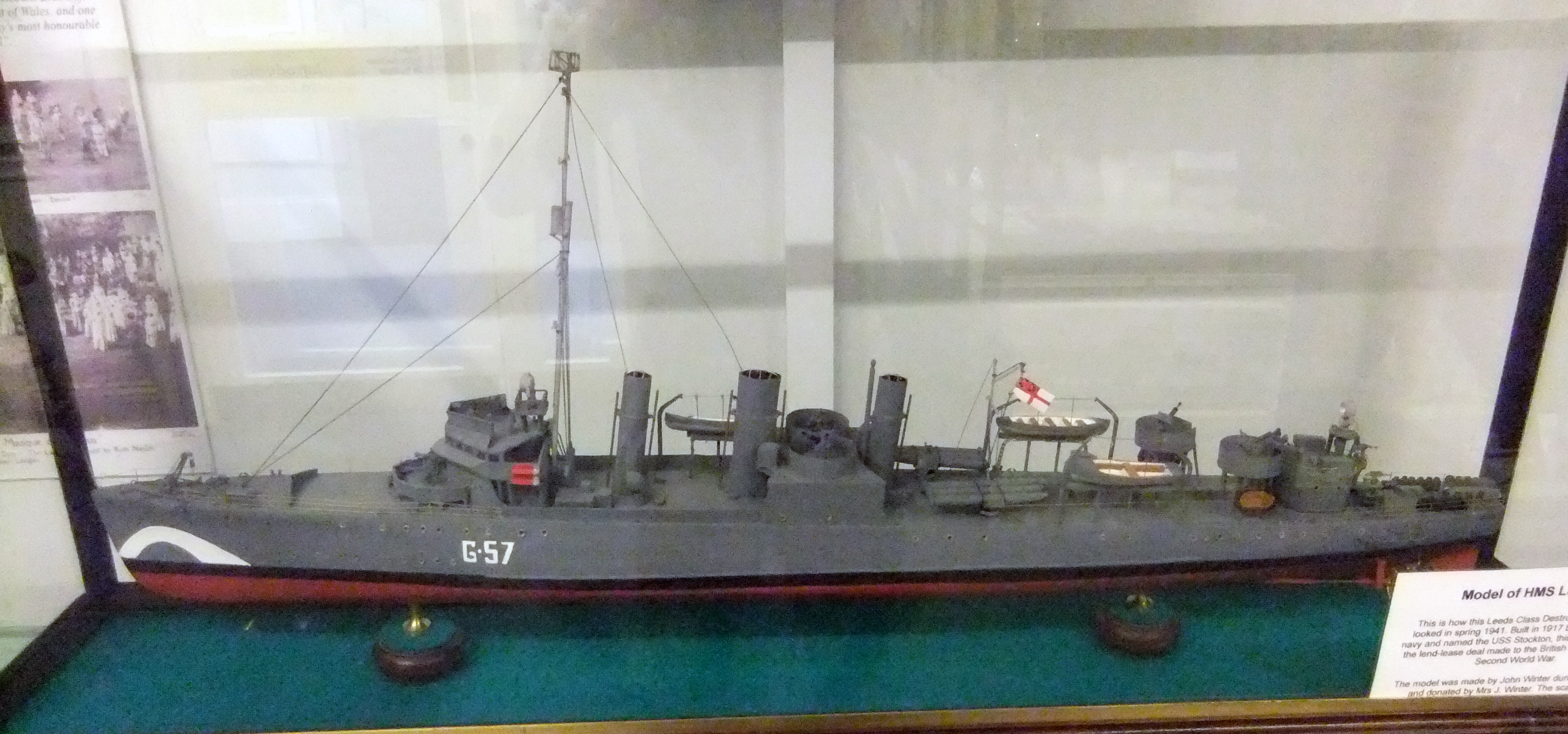
Model of Ludlow in Ludlow Museum

The destroyer served the Royal Navy as HMS Ludlow (G57) during World War II until decommissioning in June 1945. Following decommissioning, Ludlow was beached in the Firth of Forth off Yellowcraigs beach, Fidra, Dirleton, East Lothian, Scotland, on 15 July 1945 for use as a rocket target by Royal Air Force aircraft. It is reputed that the first salvo of rockets hit her just below the waterline and sank her. Her wreck lies off Yellowcraigs beach in 6 metres (20 ft) of water and, although well broken up, her remains are still visible just above the surface at low tide.
