= National Famine Museum =

Museum in Strokestown, Ireland

- Músaem Náisiúnta an Ghorta Mhóir
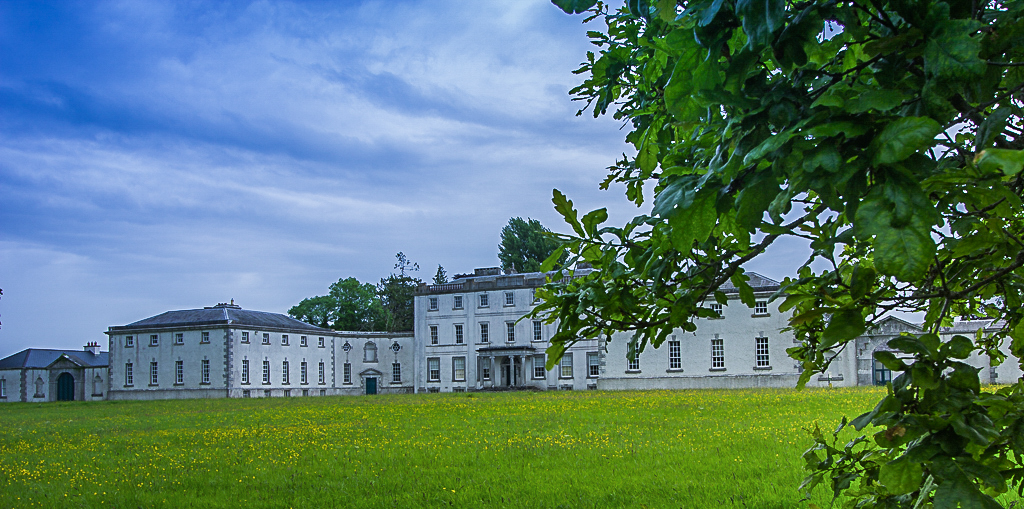
- The museum in 2014

- National Famine Museum
- Established: 14 May 1994; 32 years ago
- Location: Strokestown Park, Strokestown, County Roscommon, Ireland
- Coordinates: 53.777228°N 8.097873°W
- Website: strokestownpark.ie/national-famine-museum

The National Famine Museum (Irish: Músaem Náisiúnta an Ghorta Mhóir) is located at Strokestown Park, County Roscommon, Ireland. The museum contains records from the time of Ireland's Great Famine of 1845–1852.

== Background ==
The exhibits aim to explain the famine, which was triggered by the failure of successive potato harvests, and to draw parallels with the occurrence of famine (a widespread scarcity of food) in the world today.

The historic relevance of Strokestown is twofold. At the time of the famine, its owner was Major Denis Mahon, the first landlord to be killed in relation to the Great Famine of Ireland. Secondly, meticulous records were kept at the estate documenting the famine and emigration. The museum houses these in the Strokestown Famine Archive.

The Strokestown Park House and its estate were bought by the Westward Group in 1979. Subsequently, the museum was established by the Westward Group and all the documents on display in the museum are from the estate. Writing in the journal Museum Ireland in 1995, Colleen Dube, Assistant Keeper at the National Museum of Ireland, wrote:

Officially launched by President Robinson on Saturday, 14 May, 1994 the Famine Museum reopened this season with major changes. The Museum retained its skeletal structure of nine interconnected rooms but altered the content. In an attempt to address the accusations of being a "book on wheels" without artifacts for axels, superbly crafted models of the Mahon's Strokestown estate and the townland of Gurtoose in 1830 were added.

In 2015, the Irish Heritage Trust took responsibility for the property with the help of private philanthropic support from individual directors of the Westward Group. The group redeveloped the museum, with it reopening in 2022.

The Irish National Famine Museum is twinned with the Grosse Isle and the Irish Memorial National Historic Site in Quebec, Canada. It is not affiliated with the similarly-named National Famine Memorial at Murrisk, County Mayo or with Ireland's Great Hunger Museum in the US.

== See also ==
- List of potato museums
- Murrisk Millennium Peace Park, which contains the National Famine Memorial
