= Johnny Mahon =

Johnny Mahon may refer to:

- Johnny Mahon of the Baha Men
- Johnny Mahon (footballer) for Leeds, see Billy Furness

== See also ==
- John Mahon (disambiguation)
