= Number Twenty Nine: Georgian House Museum =

- Location within Central Dublin

General information
- Type: Townhouse
- Architectural style: Georgian
- Location: 29 Fitzwilliam Street Lower, Dublin, Ireland
- Coordinates: 53°20′17″N 6°14′52″W
- Inaugurated: 1991
- Renovated: 1988–1989
- Owner: ESB Group

Website
- numbertwentynine.ie

Number Twenty Nine: Georgian House Museum is a preserved Georgian townhouse located at 29 Fitzwilliam Street Lower near Merrion Square in Dublin, Ireland that operated as a museum until 2017. The house is furnished to show how it would have looked during the period of 1790 to 1820.

== History ==
Number Twenty Nine's first occupant was Mrs Olivia Beatty, a widow of a local wine merchant, who lived there from 1794. Beatty lived there until 1804, with the lease then taken up by banker Ponsonby Shaw. The ESB Group first took over the building in 1928, a year after the group's creation, and used the building as office until 1980. When the ESB was given permission to build office blocks facing James Street East and Baggot Street, it committed to restoring Number Twenty Nine. The refurbished building was opened in 1991, during the year Dublin was European City of Culture.

== Current use ==
Number Twenty Nine is run by the ESB Group and the National Museum of Ireland since 1991. The rooms are furnished to reflect the history of the building from 1790 to 1820, showing how the residents and their servants lived. A mix of replicas and authentic materials were used for the wallpaper and carpets. The furniture, fittings, and clothes are Georgian items from the National Museum's collection. The tours take visitors from the basement to the attic, with paintings and sketches by Irish artists, and furniture by noted craftsmen of the time.

The museum closed in 2017 to allow the construction of a new Head Office complex for ESB, the museum's owner, which was expected to take three years. A virtual tour available for viewing.

In early 2021, the ESB applied to convert the museum building into three luxury apartments. In February 2021, Dublin City Council refused planning permission, stating that: "The proposal would reduce the range of cultural and tourist activities in the city core and would set an undesirable precedent for the loss of further cultural facilities in the city". Permission was later granted and the building was converted into apartments along with adjoining buildings owned by ESB.

== 12 Fitzwilliam Street ==
In July 2023, the ESB and the Irish Heritage Trust announced they would partner to relaunch a Georgian house museum at number 12 Fitzwilliam Street.
