= Johnstown Castle =

Castle in County Wexford, Ireland

Johnstown Castle Estate
- Caisleán Bhaile Sheáín (Irish)
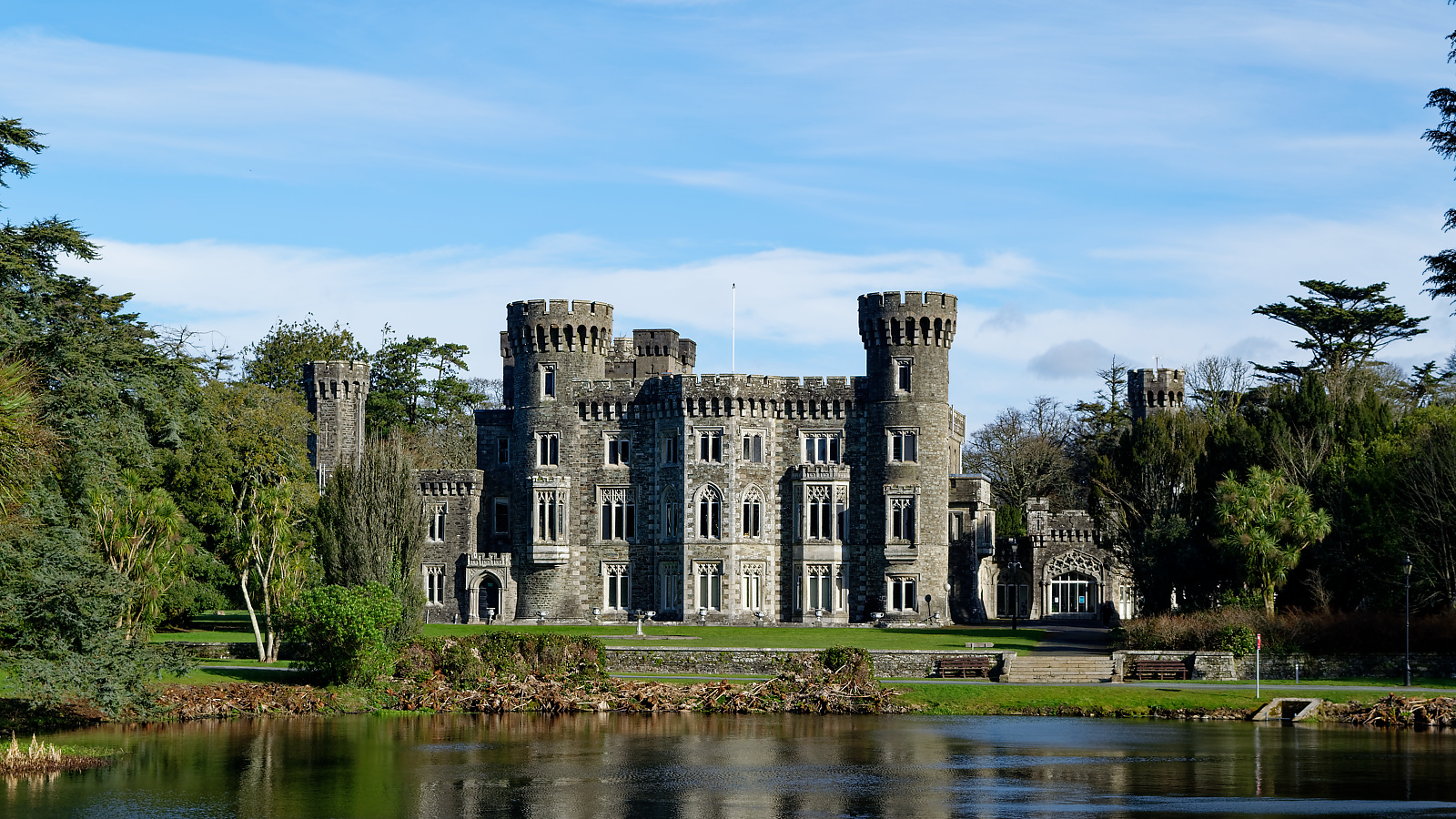
- The castle in 2020

- Location within Ireland
- 52.294042°N 6.505436°W
- Type: Castle
- Location: Johnstown, Murntown, County Wexford, Ireland

History
- Built: late 12th century (original building); 1836–1872 (current building)

Site notes
- Architectural style: Gothic Revival
- Owner: Irish Heritage Trust

Johnstown Castle is a Gothic Revival castle located in County Wexford, Ireland.

== Location ==
Johnstown Castle is located on the Johnstown Castle Estate, a 150 acres (61 ha) estate, located off the road between Murntown and Rathaspeck, 5.5 km (3.4 mi) southwest of Wexford town.

== History ==
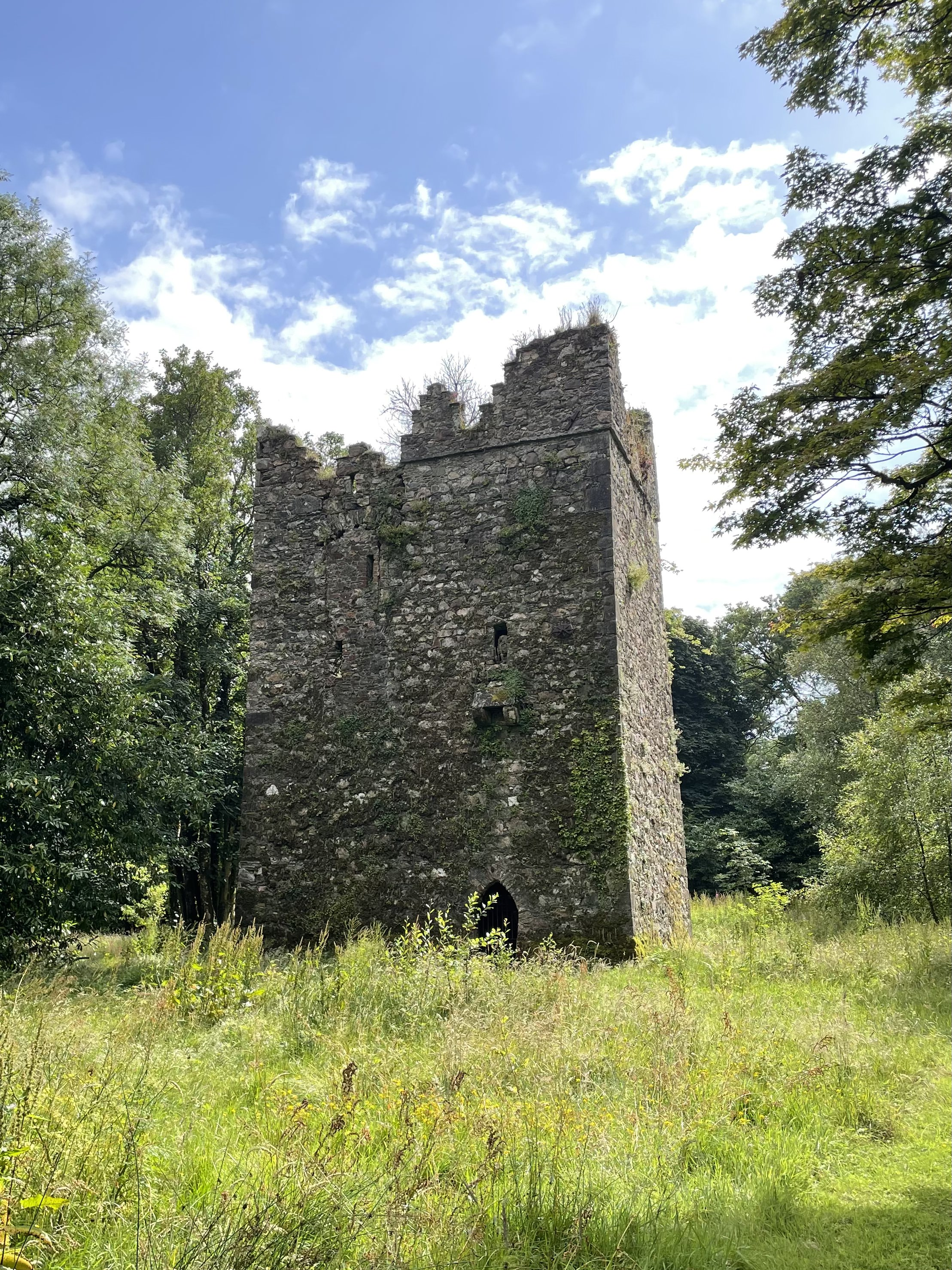
Rathlannon Tower House, built by the Norman Esmonde family, likely during the 15th century. The tower is located on the grounds of Johnstown Castle, southwest of the newer main castle.

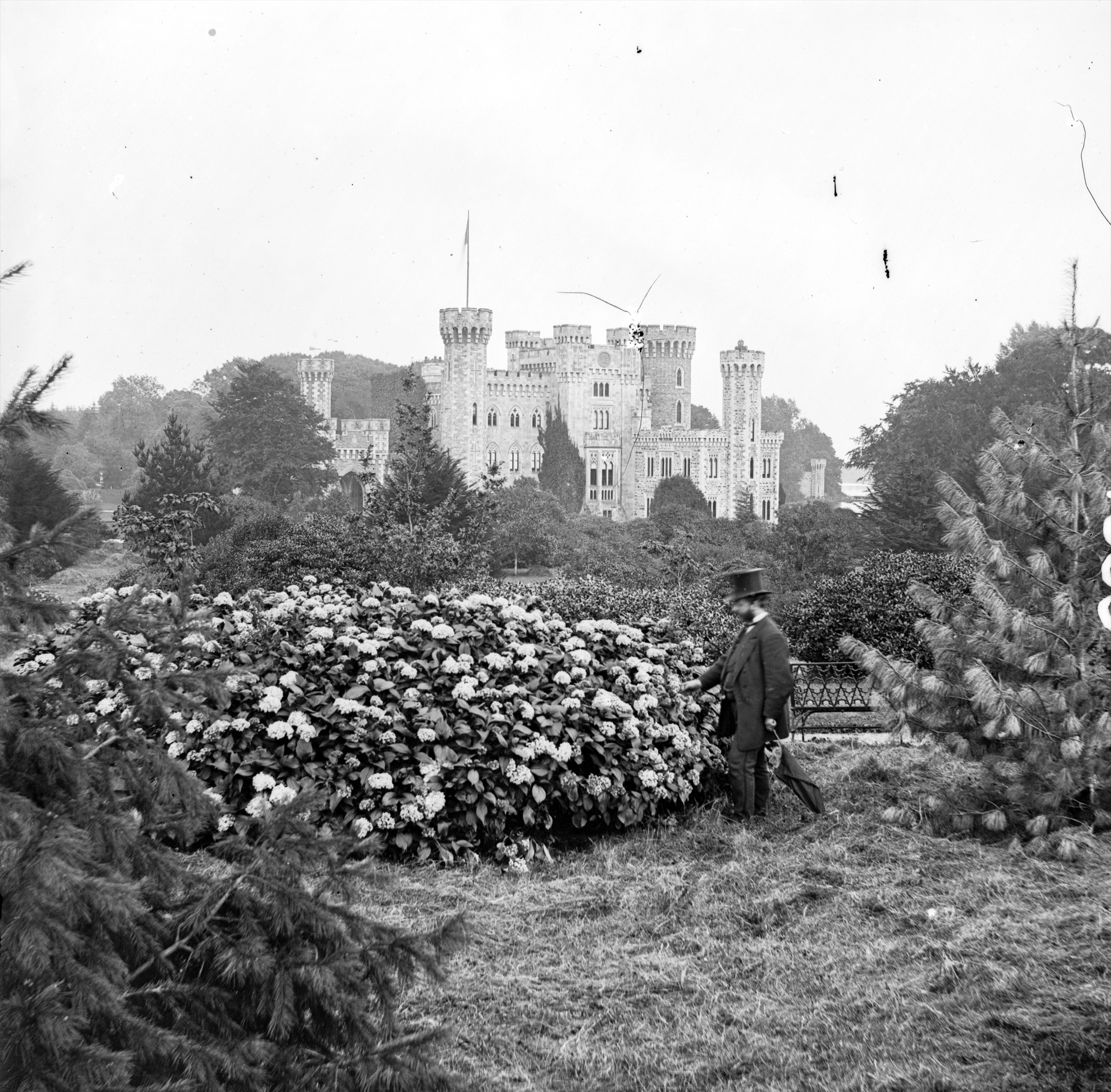
The castle c. 1860–83 with garden and Victorian gentleman (presumably one of the Grogan-Morgans) in the foreground.

The first castle built on the estate was a tower house built in the late 12th century by the Esmonde family, Normans who came to southeast Ireland from Lincolnshire in the 1170s after the Norman invasion of Ireland (1169). They also built a tower house, which still stands, at Rathlannon immediately to the south.

Oliver Cromwell spent a night on the estate in 1649, prior to the October 1649 Sack of Wexford. His Roundhead army used the land around Johnstown Castle to prepare. The Esmondes, Catholics, were expelled during the Cromwellian years.

Johnstown Castle was bought by the Grogan family in 1692.

Owner Cornelius Grogan was hanged for his part in the 1798 Rebellion; he had been commissary-general for the United Irishmen. In 1810 the estate was restored to his brother John Knox Grogan, who, with his son, Hamilton Knox Grogan-Morgan, created Johnstown Castle as it stands today, on the "bones" of the Norman tower house. Daniel Robertson designed the Gothic Revival castle and parts of the surrounding land. By 1863, the demesne was divided in two, with a deer park in the north and the castle, pleasure grounds, farm and two artificial lakes to the south. By 1836–1872 the building was finished.

The Grogans later married into the ancient FitzGerald family.

During the First World War, Royal Naval Air Service airships were based at Johnstown Castle, and were primarily used to deal with the U-boat threat, but with limited success.

Lady Maurice FitzGerald (née Lady Adelaide Jane Frances Forbes, 1860–1942), wife of Lord Maurice FitzGerald (son of Charles FitzGerald, 4th Duke of Leinster), was the last owner to live in the house.

Following the death of Lady Maurice in November 1942, the Johnstown Estate was inherited by her grandson, Maurice Victor Lakin. He looked to dispose of the Estate and it came to the attention of Wexford County Manager TD Sinnott who recommended that the Minister for Agriculture, James Ryan, acquire the castle for the purpose as an agricultural college.

On 1 May 1944, the contents of the castle were sold off at a public auction lasting five days and conducted by Jackson Stops & McCabe. On 17 October 1945, the Johnstown Castle Agricultural College Act was ratified and the castle and Estate were formally handed over to the State by the family in lieu of death duties.

The castle was taken over by the Department of Agriculture (later An Foras Talúntais from 1959 and Teagasc from 1988) and used for research into soils with laboratories created in the castle. The Castle was refurbished and opened to the public in 2019 by the Irish Heritage Trust, a non-profit. The charity continues to reinvest in the site under Curator and General Manager Matt Wheeler, and work on conserving and restoring the building continues.

The visitor attraction now welcomes over 200,000 visitors a year.

== Castle ==
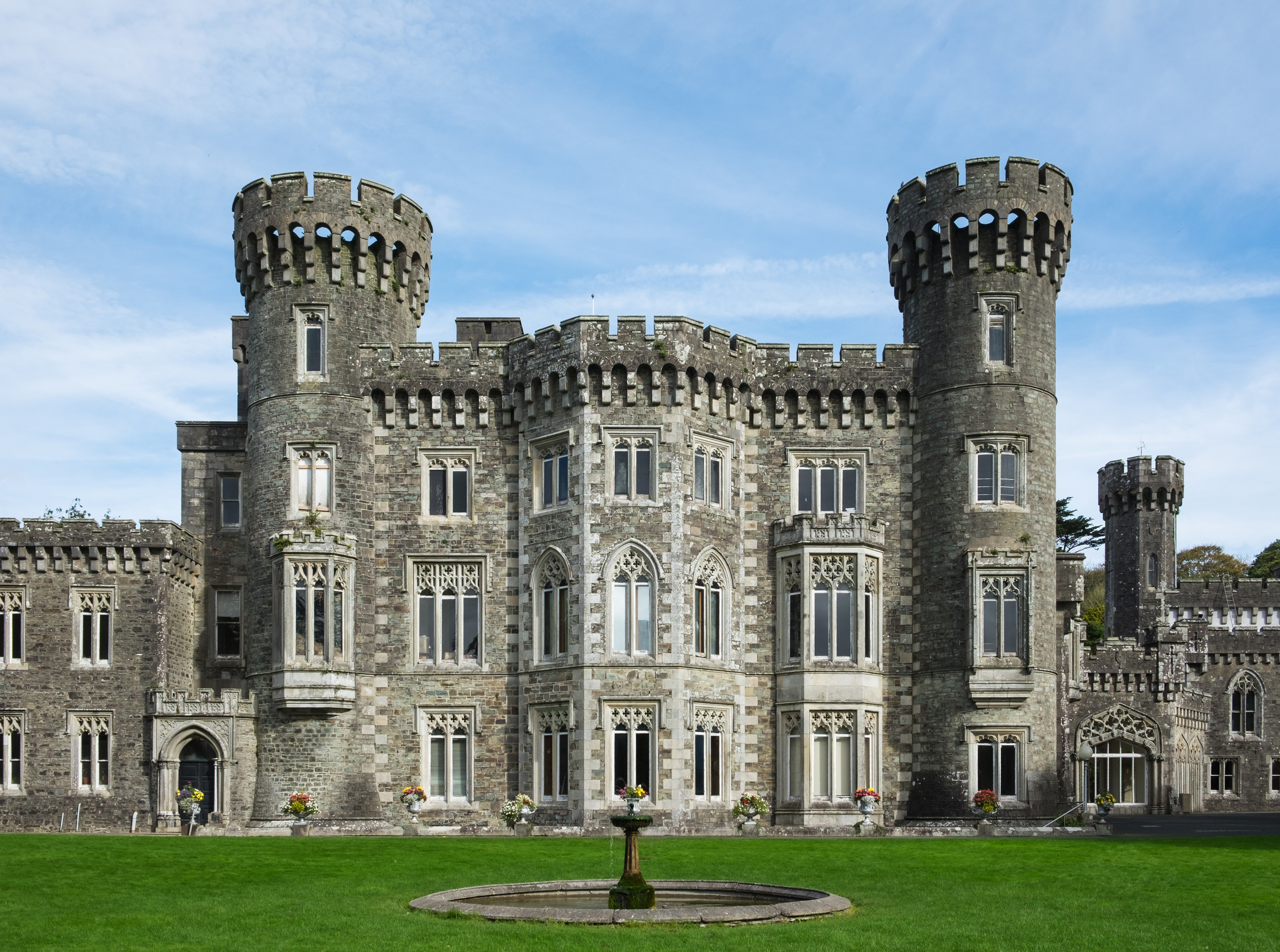
Frontal view

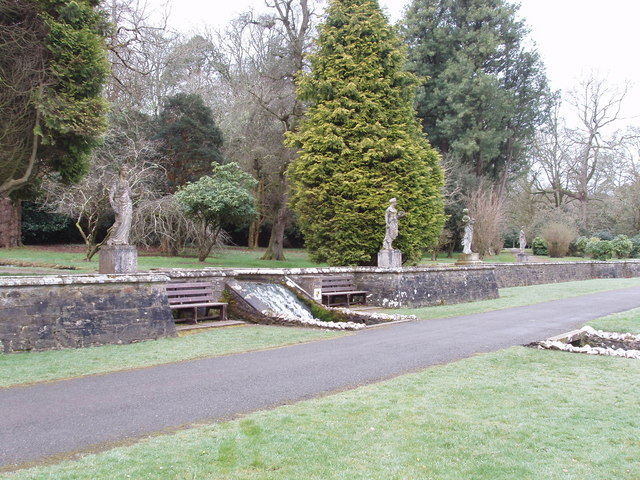
Terrace with statues

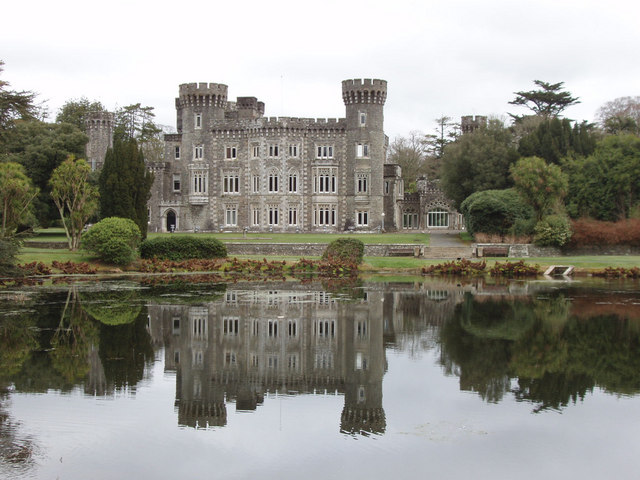
Castle reflected in the lake

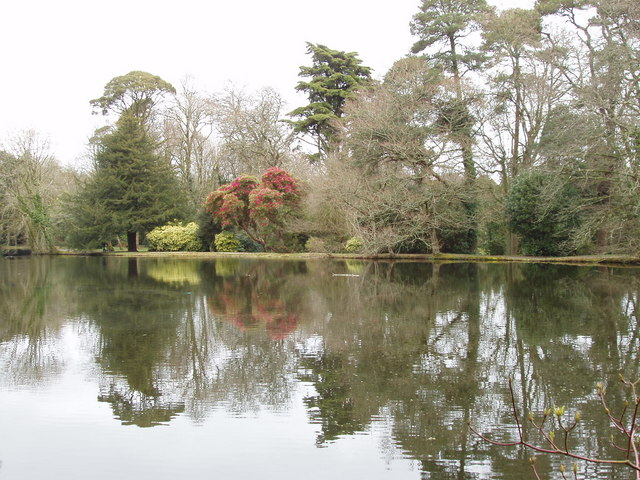
Lake and rhododendrons

A Gothic Revival castle of 4 storeys. Interior goods include the "Apostles' Hall", with wood carvings of saints, as well as oil paintings, carved oak hall benches, mahogany billiard tables, dressing tables, upholstered sofas, fire grates and brass fenders.

A servants' tunnel, 86 metres (282 ft) in length, runs from the meat house to the kitchens.

The former stable yard houses the Irish Agricultural Museum.
