= Irish Heritage Trust =

Conservation and cultural organisation in Ireland

- Formation: 2006
- Legal status: Charity
- Purpose: To look after buildings and places of historic interest for the benefit of the nation
- Headquarters: 11 Parnell Square, Dublin 1
- Location: Dublin
- Region served: Ireland
- Key people: Anne O'Donoghue (CEO); Ger Aherne (Chairperson)
- Main organ: Board of trustees
- Revenue: €7.48m (2021)
- Staff: 51 (2021)
- Website: irishheritagetrust.ie

The Irish Heritage Trust (IHT) is a heritage and cultural organisation which aims to preserve, maintain and understand notable Irish buildings to enable financial sustainability for the property. Founded by the Irish state in 2006 as a national heritage property organisation, it was partly modelled on the National Trust in the U.K.

== Operation and financing ==
While the foundation of the trust was driven by State authorities, and initiated by Minister for the Environment Dick Roche with Cabinet approval, it is independent in its operation. The trust was launched with a government grant of 5 million euro, and the majority of its funds come from state and semi-state sources but the organisation, a registered charity, raises funds from other sources also. Provision was made for property donations to the Irish Heritage Trust to be tax-efficient but this measure did not support operations at the level expected. The Trust offers a membership scheme, which entitles members to free access to its three public-access properties.

== History ==
The trust took over its first property, Fota House and Gardens, just outside Cork city, in 2007. The house had been managed for the previous 14 years by a trust established by the city and county councils of Cork as well as University College Cork, and the arboretum and gardens were managed by the Office of Public Works; the house was transferred by the end of 2007, while the surrounds were to come under IHT management after five years. The Trust also acquired an art collection from AIB. Further acquisitions were expected, but none occurred for around eight years, due to state funding limitations, and a lack of expected private donations.

The Trust added Strokestown Park, and the National Famine Museum there, to its collection in 2015, as well as assuming management, on behalf of Teagasc, of Johnstown Castle and the Agricultural Museum just outside Wexford town. Since taking over the Johnstown Castle Estate in 2019 the Estate has seen visitor numbers grow to quarter of a million visits a year. The site continues to be developed as all profits are reinvested into the trust.

In March 2023, it was announced that the trust would start on a €5.2m conservation-lead refurbishment and restoration of its headquarters at 11 Parnell Square. In July of the same year, the trust announced it would partner with the ESB Group to create a museum at 12 Lower Fitzwilliam Street on the Georgian mile.

== Trust properties ==
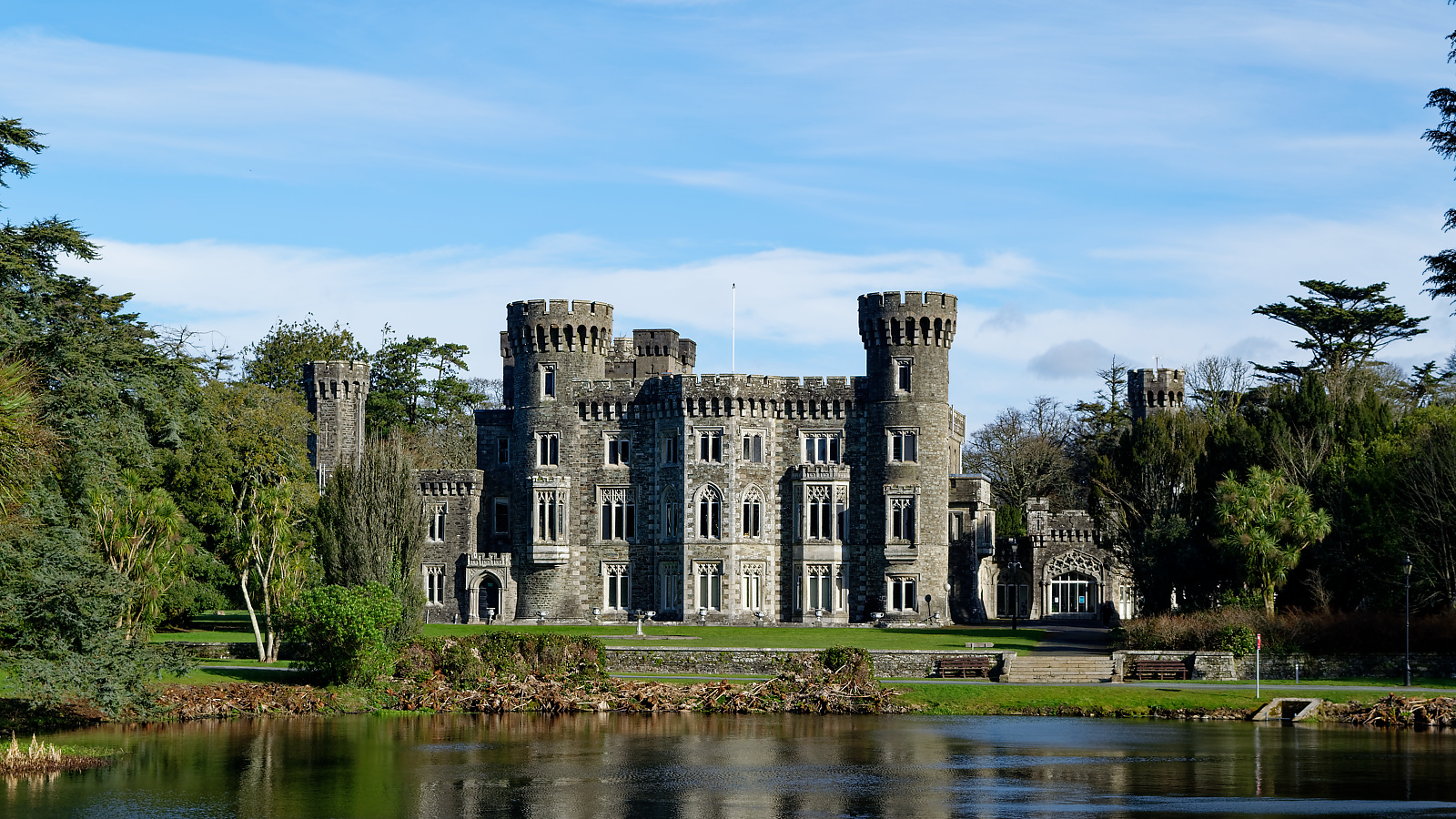
Johnstown Castle, Wexford

As of 2024, the trust has three heritage properties regularly open to the public:

- Fota House and Gardens
- Johnstown Castle
- Strokestown Park

In addition, its headquarters building is a heritage property, at number 11 Parnell Square, and it will be working to develop a museum in a Georgian house at 12 Fitzwilliam Street to replace the closed Number Twenty Nine: Georgian House Museum in Dublin's south inner city.

== Reaction ==
On the launch of the IHT, the Irish Times editorial commended the volunteer members of the board of the trust but questioned its status, describing its launch as having "a whiff of a political 'con job'" and saying that "the remit of the fine-sounding Irish Heritage Trust is so limited that the institution does not deserve the title". It also commented that An Taisce had cause for complaint about its exclusion from the IHT board.

== See also ==
- An Taisce
- Dublin Civic Trust
- Irish Georgian Society
- Irish Landmark Trust
- Limerick Civic Trust
- The Follies Trust
