= TSS Slieve Bloom =

TSS Slieve Bloom may refer to:

- TSS Slieve Bloom (1907), was a twin screw steamer cargo vessel operated by the London and North Western Railway from 1908 to 1918
- TSS Slieve Bloom (1930), was a twin screw steamer cargo vessel operated by the London, Midland and Scottish Railway from 1930 to 1948, and the British Transport Commission from 1948 to 1965
