= TSS Slieve League =

History
- Name: 1935–1967: TSS Slieve League
- Owner: 1935–1948: London, Midland and Scottish Railway; 1948–1962: British Transport Commission; 1962–1967: British Rail
- Operator: 1935–1948: London, Midland and Scottish Railway; 1948–1962: British Transport Commission; 1962–1967: British Rail
- Port of registry: (United Kingdom)
- Route: 1935–1967: Holyhead – Dublin
- Ordered: 28 June 1934
- Builder: William Denny and Brothers, Dumbarton
- Cost: £84,163
- Yard number: 1274
- Launched: 21 December 1934
- Completed: 21 February 1935
- Out of service: January 1967
- Fate: Scrapped by the Van Heyghen Brothers, Ghent

General characteristics
- Tonnage: 1,343 gross register tons (GRT)
- Length: 309.6 ft (94.4 m)
- Beam: 44.8 ft (13.7 m)
- Draught: 12.8 ft (3.9 m)

TSS Slieve League was a twin screw steamer cargo vessel operated by the London, Midland and Scottish Railway from 1935 to 1948, and the British Transport Commission from 1948 to 1962.

== History ==
She was built by William Denny and Brothers of Dumbarton, launched in 1934 and handed over to the London, Midland and Scottish Railway in 1935.

She replaced the Slieve Bawn of 1905 and was named after the Slieve League cliffs in County Donegal.

Her lifeboats were fitted with propellers that could be worked by hand.

On the outbreak of the Second World War in 1939, her port of registry was changed from Dublin to London.
