= Jack Mahon =

Jack Mahon may refer to:

- Jack Mahon (Gaelic footballer), Irish Gaelic footballer
- Jack Mahon (footballer, born 1886), English football player
- Jack Mahon (footballer, born 1911), English football player and manager

== See also ==
- John Mahon (disambiguation)
