= Denis Mahon (British Army officer) =

Irish landowner (died 1847)

Major Denis Mahon was the Irish landlord of Strokestown in County Roscommon who was shot and killed during the Great Famine of Ireland. His death is considered the first murder of a landlord during the Great Famine and to this day there is debate over the real reason for his murder and the identity of those responsible. Mahon's murder caused panic among the aristocracy and turned English public opinion against the Irish in the midst of the Black ‘47.

== Biography ==
Born in about 1787 to Reverend Thomas Mahon and into a family of clergymen, Denis Mahon joined the British Army and rose to the rank of Major in the 9th Dragoons.

He married Henrietta Bathhurst and the two had one child together, Grace Catherine Mahon. Grace would go on to marry Henry Sandford Pakenham, Dean of St Patrick's Cathedral, in 1847. Henry took the last name Pakenham Mahon as he would be the heir to the estates of the Mahon family upon Denis' death.

The estate included Strokestown Park in County Roscommon, the outbuildings of which now house the National Famine Museum. Strokestown Park was owned by the (Pakenham) Mahon family from the mid 1600s until 1979, when it was sold to the present owners, the Callery family's Westward Holdings. Denis Mahon is buried in a mausoleum on the property.

== Landlord of Strokestown ==
=== Strokestown debts ===
One of Denis Mahon's predecessors, his uncle Maurice Mahon took over running the Strokestown estate in 1782, and in 1800 was raised to the Irish peerage as Baron Hartland of Strokestown. Maurice borrowed 15,000 pounds in order to enlarge the estate and by the time of his death, the debt grew by 50%. His son Thomas succeeded him in 1819 but had no children and died in 1835, passing on the title of Baron Hartland and the Strokestown estate to his youngest brother Maurice. At this time the 41-year lease of the Strokestown estate lands to the crown was ending and the Mahon's were now 30,000 pounds in debt. Maurice allowed the lease to lapse for a portion of the estate and the Mahon's stopped collecting rent from the town of Ballykilcline and its surrounding area. In 1836 Denis brought a motion against Maurice claiming that he was mentally ill and incapable of caring for the estate which led to an official declaration stating Maurice was a lunatic and Denis was named the executor of the estate as well as Maurice's legal guardian. Denis soon began trying to fix the estates issues and renewed the lease with the crown, sending notice to the people of Ballykilcline that they were required to pay their rent including the 3 years of arrears.

=== Rent strike ===
Starting nearly as soon as Mahon became the landlord of Roscommon tenants began a rent strike starting with 8 farmers in 1835 and eventually reaching a point where nearly every tenant refused to pay rent. The people of Roscommon wanted lower rent and taking a cue from others striking in England and Ireland they planned on refusing to pay until they got what they wanted.

=== Evictions ===
Mahon chose to serve evictions to the increasing number of tenants who refused to pay their taxes, forcibly removing them from their homes. They quickly returned however and took up residence again in their houses. The tenants would be forced out and would again return which created a cycle that frustrated Mahons plans.

At the advice of his cousin and estate agent, John Ross Mahon, Denis began a mass "assisted emigration scheme." in which he evicted thousands of people and chartered spots for many of them aboard ships destined for Quebec. Ships like the ones Mahon chartered were often referred to as Coffin Ships for the inhumane conditions that the people in transport suffered.

The first ship Mahon sent during the clearance of his land was The Virginius which took 476 people and left Liverpool in may of 1847. Upon its arrival in Quebec Dr. George Mellis Douglas, superintendent of the quarantine site built to prevent the spread of cholera from new arrivals, examined the passengers who arrived at the Grosse-Île in Quebec. He wrote that 106 of the passengers were ill, 158 had died on the journey and "the few that were able to come on deck were ghastly yellow looking specters" This ship was followed by three more filled with Mahons tenants. The Naomi, The Erin’s Queen, and The John Munn all of which were inspected by Douglas who wrote of similar conditions on board those ships. News that nearly half of the people put on the ships by Mahon had died made it back to Roscommon in August of that year reaching the remaining tenants, many of whom had friends, loved ones, and long-time neighbours on board those ships.

At the end of August 1847, Mahon returned from England to Roscommon where he had left local Catholic priest Michael McDermott in his place filling in as the chairman of the Strokestown famine relief committee. McDermott accused Mahon of amusing himself by "burning houses and turning out people to starve."

== Murder ==
On the 2nd of November, 1847, Mahon and a physician, Terence Shanley, were riding home in a carriage from a famine relief meeting when they were ambushed and Mahon shot and killed. Within an hour of his death, bonfires were lit on the hills across Roscommon in celebration of his murder. Mahon's murder was followed by a series of attacks on other landlords in Roscommon, such as the murder of Reverend John Lloyd of Aughrim only three weeks after. Other Roscommon landlords received threatening letters and some experienced violence.

Reverend Michael McDermott was accused of inciting violence against Mahon, which resulted in allegations by the aristocracy that Mahon's murder was caused by a Catholic conspiracy against Protestant landlords. The accusation against McDermott was made in parliament by Lord Farnham of the Orange order. Farnham claimed that at the Sunday mass prior to Mahon's murder, McDermott had said from the pulpit, "Major Mahon is worse than Cromwell and yet he lives". McDermott denied the accusation and stated the sole cause of Mahon's murder was "the infamous and inhuman cruelties which were wantonly and unnecessarily exercised against a tenantry, whose feelings were already wound up to woeful and vengeful exasperation by the loss of their exiled relatives, as well as by hunger and pestilence".

The investigation was led by police who flooded Roscommon and began investigating the death of Mahon and John Lloyd at the same time. They bribed possible witnesses for information and even evicted people who refused to cooperate in the hopes of finding out the names of the culprits. Three people were arrested for the murder of Mahon and a fourth escaped. Andrew Connor evaded capture in Ireland and fled to Canada where he reportedly met up with his family and continued to evade Canadian authorities, eventually disappearing. The other three men who were arrested and tried at the summer assizes in 1848 were Michael Gardener, Owen Beirne, and Patrick Hasty. Gardener pleaded guilty on the condition that he would be spared the death penalty. This condition was granted and he was charged with conspiracy to murder and was sentenced to transportation for life. Beirne and Hasty were both hanged on the 8th of August, 1848, and signed gallows confessions. In Hasty's confession, he renounced his association with the "accursed system of Molly Maguireism", which has furthered speculation that this was a conspiracy involving the Molly Maguires targeting landlords as enemies of the people.
