= Sir William Mahon, 7th Baronet =

Sir William Walter Mahon, 7th Baronet
- Born: 4 December 1940; Kennington, Surrey, England
- Military career
- Allegiance: United Kingdom
- Branch: British Army
- Rank: Colonel
- Units: Irish Guards, Honourable Corps of Gentlemen at Arms
- Awards: Lieutenant of the Royal Victorian Order

Colonel Sir William Walter Mahon, 7th Baronet, LVO (born 4 December 1940) is a retired British Army officer. He is descended from Sir Ross Mahon, 1st Baronet (1763-1835), Member of Parliament for Ennis, who was created a baronet on 14 April 1819. He succeeded his father to the baronetcy in 1987, and his heir is his only son, James William.

== Early life and career ==
The son of Sir George Edward John Mahon, 6th Baronet, and of Audrey Evelyn (née Jagger), Mahon was educated at Eton and was commissioned into the Irish Guards in 1960. He served with the British Army in the United Kingdom, Germany, Malaysia, Aden, Hong Kong, Pakistan, and Spain. From 1993, he was a member of HM the Queen's body guard, the Honourable Corps of Gentlemen at Arms, and served as the unit's Clerk of the Cheque and Adjutant from 2006 to 2008 and as its Standard Bearer from 2008. For these services, he was appointed Lieutenant of the Royal Victorian Order (LVO) in the 2011 New Year Honours.

== Personal life ==
He was active as a fundraiser for Macmillan Cancer Relief from 1993 to 2002 and became Chairman of the National Army Museum Development Trust in 2003.

In 1968, he married Rosemary Jane, younger daughter of Lt-Colonel M. E. Melvill OBE of Symington, Lanarkshire, and they have one son (James William Mahon, born 29 October 1976) and two daughters.

Baronetage of the United Kingdom
| Preceded by George Mahon | Baronet (of Castlegar); 1987– | Incumbent |
