= Irish Agricultural Museum =

- Musaem Talmhaíochta na hÉireann

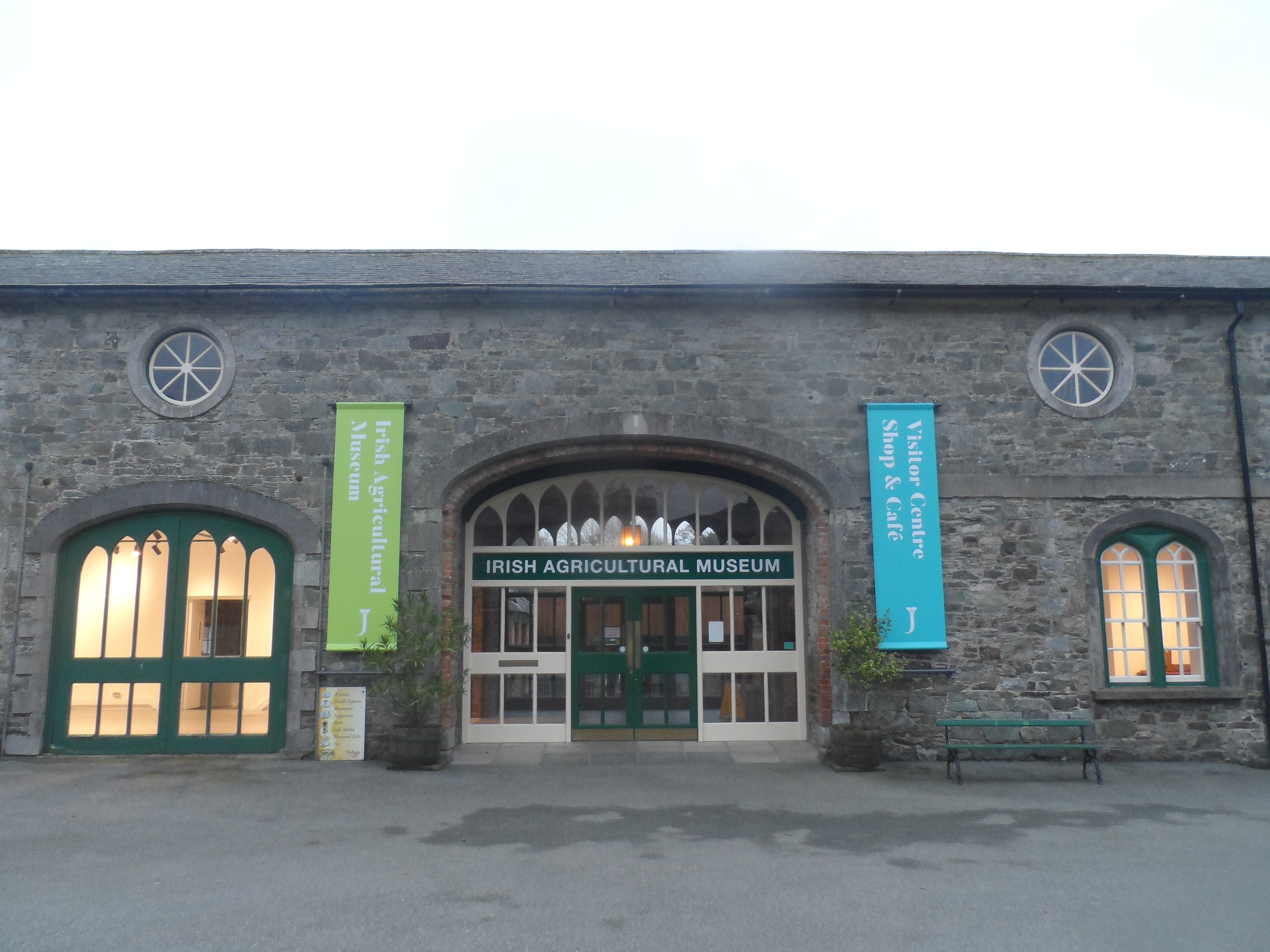

- Location within Ireland
- Established: 1976
- Location: Johnstown Castle Estate, County Wexford, Ireland
- Coordinates: 52.293154°N 6.504663°W
- Type: Agricultural museum
- Visitors: 60,000 per annum
- Chairperson: Willie French
- Curator: Matt Wheeler
- Public transit access: Johnstown Castle bus stop (878 bus)
- Website: johnstowncastle.ie/irish-agricultural-museum/

The Irish Agricultural Museum (Irish: Musaem Talmhaíochta na hÉireann) is a museum dedicated to the history of Irish rural life. Housed in the farm and stable courtyard buildings of Johnstown Castle, County Wexford, the collections represent all elements of rural life, including transport, crafts, farming activities and dwelling.

== History ==
In the early 1970s Dr Austin O’Sullivan began collecting materials relating to farming and rural life in Ireland. In 1974 Dr Thomas Walsh, the Director of An Foras Talúntais (now Teagasc), agreed to the foundation of an agricultural museum. From this, a group formed in 1976 with the aim of setting up a museum to house this collection, amongst others. The museum, housed in the former farm buildings of Johnstown Castle Estate, was opened in 1979 by Irish President Patrick Hillery. Since the opening, the museum has expanded and now occupies 1,900 square metres of gallery space. The establishment and expansion of the museum has led to the continuing restoration of the estate's farming buildings which date from 1810.

Matt Wheeler took over as Curator in 2011 and added new exhibitions, including the Harvesting Machinery Hall, and extended the opening hours to establish the museum as a year round destination. The museum has been managed and run by the Irish Heritage Trust since 2019. It was awarded full accredited museum status by the Heritage Council in July 2022.

== Contents ==
The main focus of the museum's collections was to document the changes in farming life in the wake of the industrial revolution, in particular the move away from horse-powered machinery to those powered by engines. The collections are organised by agricultural themes, such as dairy, the laundry, the kitchen, sugar beet farming and so on. The museum also features an extensive exhibition on the history of the potato and the Great Famine mid 1800s. The collection contains number 96 in The Irish Times A History of Ireland in 100 Objects, a washing machine from the early 1950s. There are a number of full-scale replicas of workshops of a blacksmith, cooper, wheelwright, harness maker and basket maker.

The museum won the Best Museum 2014, a competition organised by the Industrial Heritage Association of Ireland, in recognition of the role the Museum has played in the preservation and promotion of the material history relating to Irish rural life.

== Gallery of exhibits ==
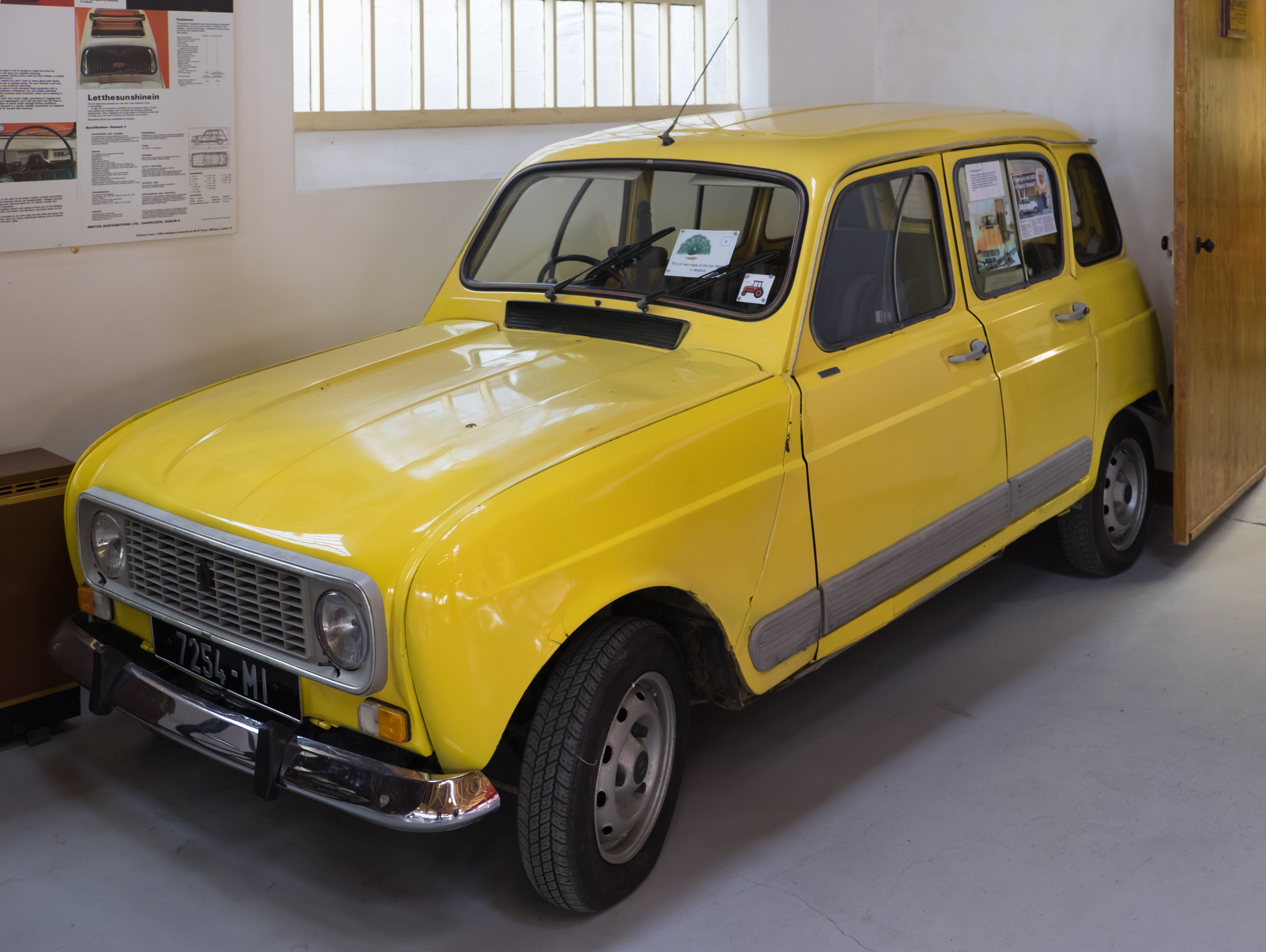
Renault R4 GTL built in 1982 in Wexford

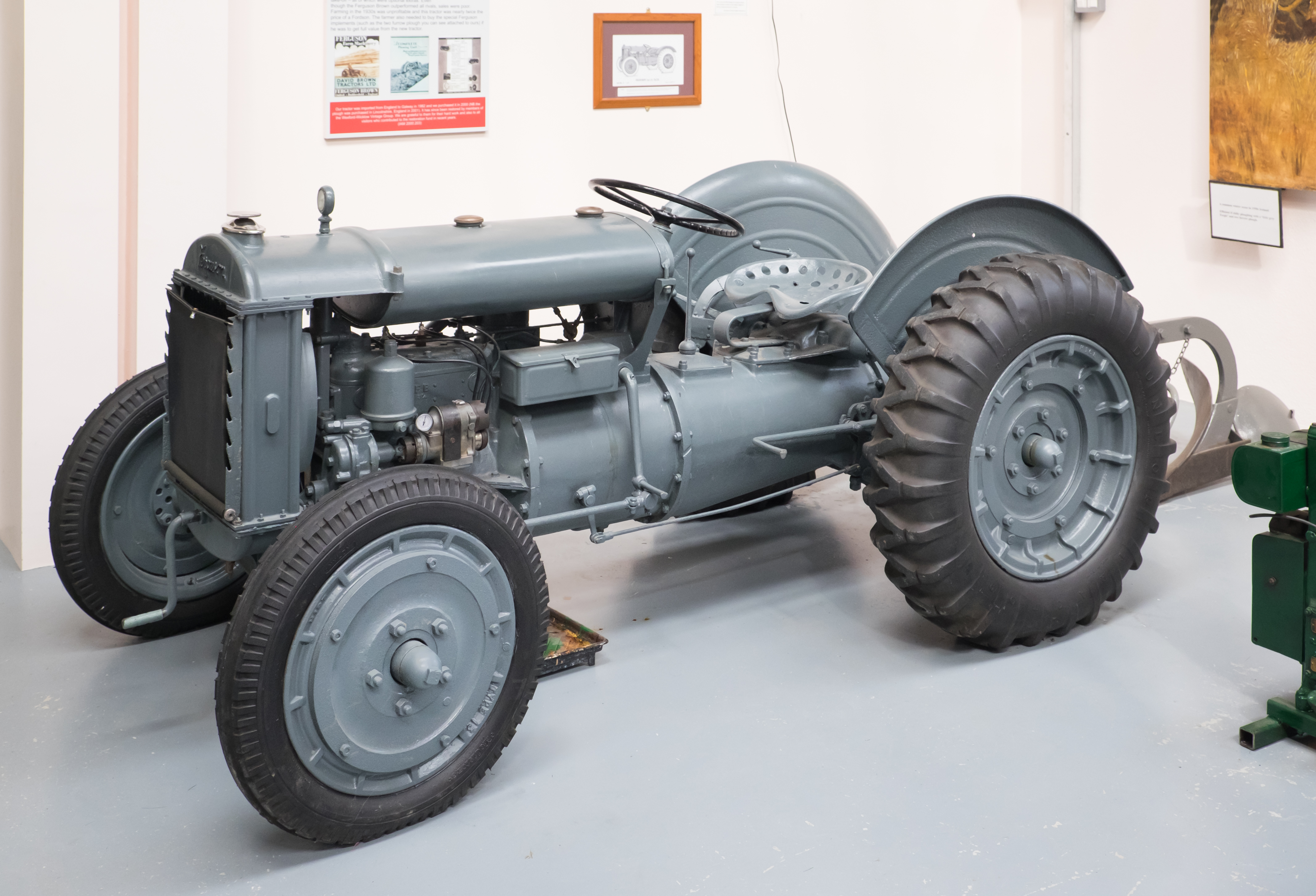
Ferguson-Brown Model A tractor (produced 1936-1939)

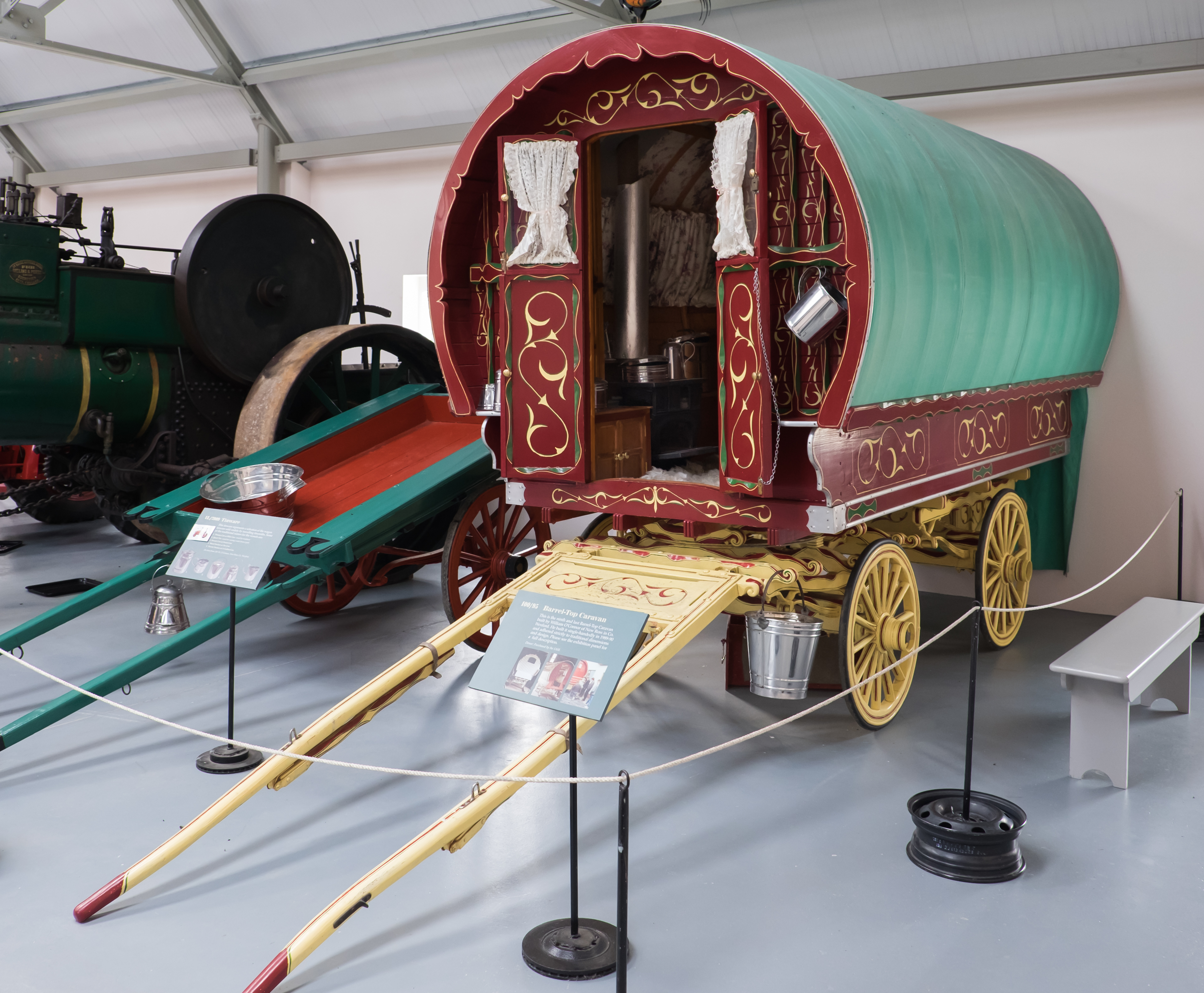
Barrel-top caravan

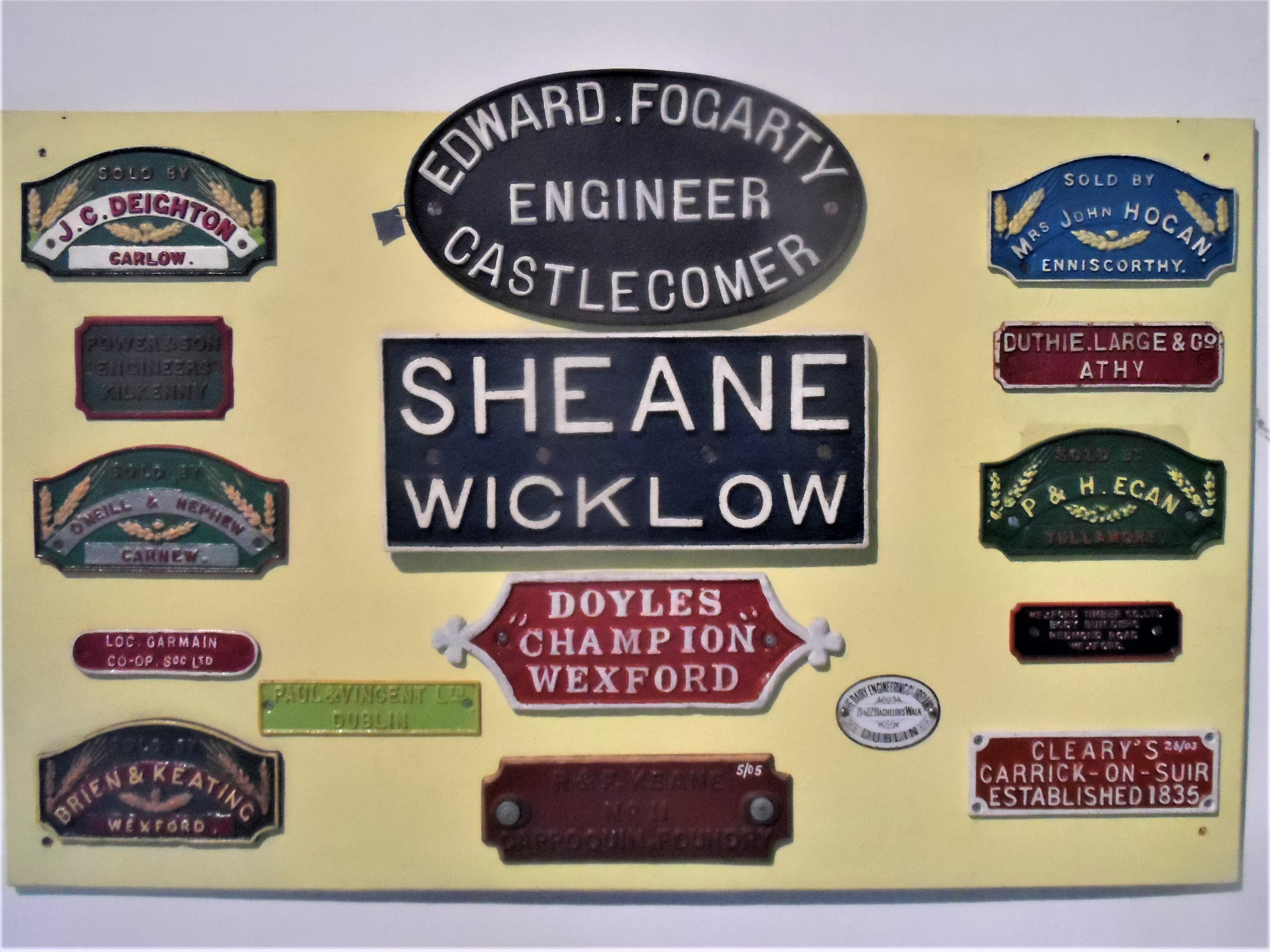
Plaques from Irish machinery manufacturers
