= Mahon baronets =

Baronetcy in the Baronetage of the United Kingdom

The Mahon Baronetcy, of Castlegar in the County of Galway, is a title in the Baronetage of the United Kingdom. It was created on 14 April 1819 for Ross Mahon, Member of Parliament for Ennis in 1820. The family surname is pronounced "Mahn".

== Mahon baronets, of Castlegar (1819) ==
- Sir Ross Mahon, 1st Baronet (1763–1835)
- Sir Ross Mahon, 2nd Baronet (1811–1842)
- Sir James Fitzgerald Mahon, 3rd Baronet (1812–1852)
- Sir William Vesey Ross Mahon, 4th Baronet (1813–1893)
- Sir William Henry Mahon, 5th Baronet (1856–1926)
- Sir George Edward John Mahon, 6th Baronet (1911–1987)
- Sir William Walter Mahon, 7th Baronet (born 1940)

The heir apparent to the baronetcy is James William Mahon (born 1976), only son of the 7th Baronet.

Baronetage of the United Kingdom
Preceded by Hamilton baronets	Mahon baronets of Castlegar; 14 April 1819	Succeeded by Innes baronets
