= TSS Slieve Bloom (1907) =

Twin screw steamer cargo vessel

History
- Name: 1908–1918: TSS Slieve Bloom
- Owner: 1908–1918: London and North Western Railway
- Operator: 1908–1918: London and North Western Railway
- Port of registry: (United Kingdom)
- Builder: Vickers, Sons & Maxim Ltd, Barrow-in-Furness
- Launched: 5 November 1907
- Completed: January 1908
- Fate: Sunk 31 March 1918

General characteristics
- Tonnage: 1,166 gross register tons (GRT)
- Length: 299.5 ft (91.3 m)
- Beam: 37.2 ft (11.3 m)
- Draught: 14.1 ft (4.3 m)

TSS Slieve Bloom was a twin screw steamer cargo vessel operated by the London and North Western Railway from 1908 to 1918.

== History ==
She was completed by Vickers, Sons and Maxim Limited for the London and North Western Railway in 1908.

She sank near South Stack lighthouse after a collision with the USS Stockton on 31 March 1918, with the loss of all her cargo including 370 cattle and 12 horses. One passenger died; the others were evacuated to lifeboats and rescued by another ship.
