= TSS Slieve Bawn (1905) =

History
- Name: 1905–1927: TSS Slieve Bawn
- Owner: 1905–1923: London and North Western Railway; 1923–1935: London, Midland and Scottish Railway
- Operator: 1905–1923: London and North Western Railway; 1923–1935: London, Midland and Scottish Railway
- Port of registry: (United Kingdom)
- Route: 1905–1935: Holyhead – Dublin
- Builder: Harland & Wolff
- Yard number: 370
- Launched: 6 July 1905
- Completed: 10 October 1905
- Out of service: 1935
- Fate: Scrapped 1935

General characteristics
- Tonnage: 1,148 gross register tons (GRT)
- Length: 300.2 ft (91.5 m)
- Beam: 39.3 ft (12.0 m)

TSS Slieve Bawn was a twin screw steamer passenger and cargo vessel operated by the London and North Western Railway from 1905 to 1923, and the London, Midland and Scottish Railway from 1923 to 1935.

== History ==
She was built by Harland & Wolff of Belfast for the London and North Western Railway in 1905.

She was named after the mountain Slieve Bawn in Ireland

In 1917 she came to the rescue of passengers from the White Star Liner RMS Celtic when this ship hit a mine off the Isle of Man.

She was scrapped in 1935 and replaced by the Slieve League.
