= James Mahon =

James Mahon may refer to:

- James Patrick Mahon (1800–1891), Irish nationalist journalist, barrister, parliamentarian and international mercenary
- Patrick Swift (1927–1983), Irish painter who sometimes wrote under the pseudonym James Mahon
- James Mahon (priest) (1773–1837), Anglican priest in Ireland
