= Mark Mahon =

Mark Mahon may refer to:

- Mark Mahon (director) (born 1973), Irish film director, writer and producer
- Mark Mahon (ice hockey) (born 1965), Canadian-German ice hockey player and coach
- Mark Mahon (politician) (born 1957), American politician in Florida
- Mark P. Mahon (1930–2017), American politician in Minnesota
