= John Mahon =

John Mahon may refer to:

- John Mahon (baseball) (1851–1928), baseball owner and politician
- John Mahon (composer) (1749–1839), musician and composer
- John Mahon (Australian footballer) (1940–2014), Australian rules footballer
- John Mahon (Irish footballer) (born 1999), Irish footballer
- John Mahon (politician) (1901–1975), British communist political activist
- John Mahon (actor) (1938–2020), American film, stage and television actor
- John Mahon, drummer and vocalist with the Elton John Band
- John K. Mahon (1912–2003), historian
- John Lincoln Mahon (1865–1933), British socialist activist
- John Christopher Mahon (1922–2004), Irish-born priest in Kenya
- Sir John Denis Mahon (1910–2011), British scholar

== See also ==
- Johnny Mahon (disambiguation)
- Jack Mahon (disambiguation)
