= Slieve Bawn =

Hill in County Roscommon, Ireland

- Sliabh Bána
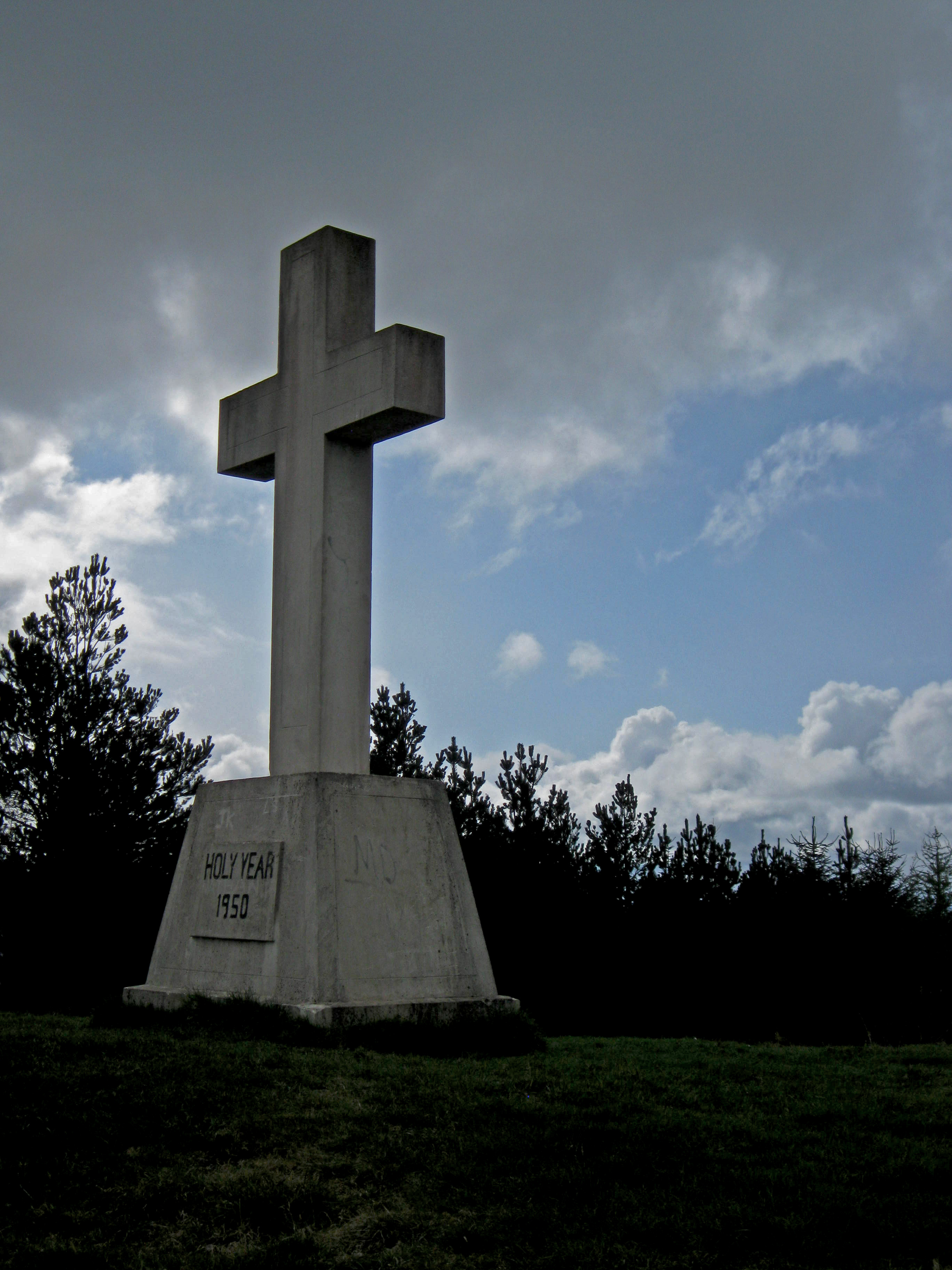
- The Holy Year Cross erected in 1950

Highest point
- Elevation: 262 m (860 ft)
- Prominence: 215 m (705 ft)
- Listing: Marilyn
- Coordinates: 53°43′44″N 8°4′2.8″W

Geography
- Location within Ireland
- Location: Telton, County Roscommon, Ireland

Slieve Bawn or Sliabh Bághna (meaning "Mountain of Bághna", ancient Firbolg chieftain) is a hill in County Roscommon, Ireland. It lies between Strokestown (to the northwest) and Ballyleague (to the southeast). It is the third-highest point in the county, after Kilronan Mountain and Seltannasaggart.

== Archaeology ==
The 1837 Ordnance Survey Ireland 6" map shows no indication of any archaeological features atop the hill, but in 1950, when the Holy Year Cross was raised on the hilltop, skeletal remains were uncovered. This suggests that a passage grave once sat atop the hill.

Passage graves are usually cairns containing a passage leading to a central corbelled-roofed chamber, which is sometimes a cruciform shape. Passage graves are sometimes found in prominent locations, such as on hill-tops. Generally speaking, the less complex the passage tomb the older it is.

== Cross ==
The cross was erected by local people for the Christian Jubilee of 1950.

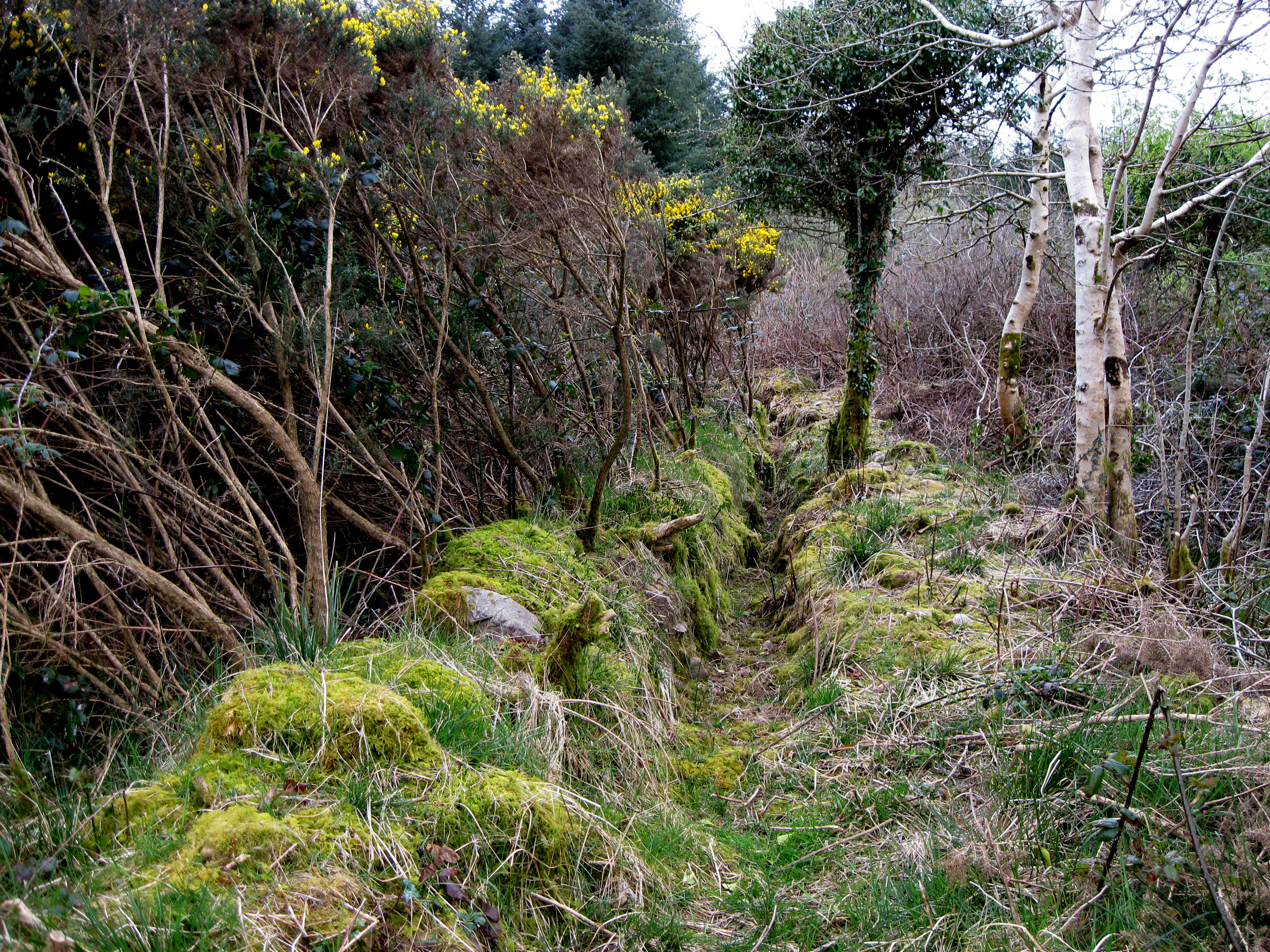
Ruined church
