= Associated Humber Lines =

Associated Humber Lines (AHL) was created in 1935 to manage the services of various railway controlled shipping lines including port activities in the Humber area of the United Kingdom. The ownership of the respective vessels did not transfer to A.H.L and similarly the ports concerned, Hull, Goole and Grimsby, also remained under the control of the railway companies and their successors.

House flag of Associated Humber Lines

The operation was formed by the amalgamation of the following companies' shipping services:

- London, Midland & Scottish Railway – Goole Steam Shipping Co
- Hull & Netherlands Steamship Company
- London & North Eastern Railway (LNER) – Great Central section
- London, Midland & Scottish Railway – Goole services
- Wilson's & North Eastern Railway Shipping Co – wholly owned by LNER

At formation, the joint service operated to 18 continental destinations.

== History ==
In May 1935 the organisation was formed to take over the management of the ships and ports and in June the control committee commenced to function and the process of rationalisation began.

At formation the fleet consisted of 30 ships from the following ownership:

London, Midland and Scottish Railway's – Goole Steam Shipping Co. Ltd.:

"Aire", "Alt", "Besline", "Besway", "Blyth", "Dearne", "Don", "Douglas", "Hebble", "Hodder", "Irwell", "Mersey", "Ouse", "Rother", "Rye", "Transport" and "West Riding".

Hull and Netherlands S.S. Co. Ltd. (wholly owned subsidiary of LNER):

"Melrose Abbey" and "Jervaulx Abbey".

London and North Eastern Railway Company (LNER) (Great Central section):

"Accrington", "Bury", "Dewsbury", Macclesfield, Stockport, Felixstowe,"City of Bradford" and "City of Leeds".

Wilson's & N.E.R. Shipping Ltd. (LNER the majority shareholder):

"Harrogate", "Hull", "Selby" and "York".

At handover, two ships of the LNER were laid up – "City of Bradford" and "City of Leeds".

A listing of the ships details and their histories can be found below.

By mid 1937 the integrated fleet had been reduced by six ships, and war losses in the managed fleet and the urgent need for vessels elsewhere around the UK for other services depleted the fleet further.

In 1957 the style became Associated Humber Lines Ltd., with the British Transport Commission being a 91 per cent shareholder and the balance of shares were held by Ellerman's Wilson Line. All the existing fleet at that time were transferred to the new entity and a fleet renewal programme was put in place.

The first of eight newly built ships was delivered in 1958, and in 1959 AHL's operation was expanded to include the Hull-New Holland ferry service.

Control of AHL was transferred to the Transport Holding Company in January 1963 and onwards again to the National Freight Corporation in 1969.

Having faced severe competition from short sea container operators and roll-on/roll-off ferries, operations declined and by 1968 had been reduced to just two container services from Hull to Rotterdam and Antwerp. Losses were such that in November 1971 the AHL operation was closed. The final sailings from Antwerp and Rotterdam being performed by "Leeds" and "Melrose Abbey".

== Livery ==
1935–1939: Funnel – Buff with red band touching black top with 'A H L' in black on red band. Hulls – Black with red boot topping. Fawn-Brown uppers with black vents.

1946 onwards: Uppers changed to white.

Houseflag – Blue with white disc. Red letters 'A H L' on the white disc.

== Routes ==
1935–1939: Goole to German, Dutch and Belgian Ports.

1935–1939: Goole to some French Ports with southern limit at Bordeaux.

1946–1964: Goole to Rotterdam and Amsterdam.

1946–1965: Goole to Copenhagen and Bremen.

1935–1939: Grimsby to Hamburg and Antwerp.

1935–1940: Grimsby to Rotterdam

1946–1967: Hull to Amsterdam, Bremen and Hamburg.

1946–1971: Hull to Antwerp and Rotterdam.

== Ships transferred to AHL management in 1935 ==
From London and North Eastern Railway (LNER)

Ship	Launched	Tonnage GRT	Notes and references
Accrington	1910	1,629	Built in 1910 for the Great Central Railway and served on the Grimsby–Hamburg, Germany route. Acquired by LNER in 1923 and passed to AHL in 1935. From July 1942 used as a convoy rescue ship during the Second World War and completed 40 escort voyages. Returned to the LNER post-war and in 1946 with her sister Dewsbury was transferred to Harwich to replace war losses. Passed to British Railways in 1948. Served until scrapped in 1951 mainly on the Harwich – Antwerp route.
SS Bury	1910	1,634	A sister of Accrington which entered Great Central Railway's Grimsby-Hamburg service in January 1911. Seized in Hamburg in August 1914 and used by Germany as an accommodation ship for pilotage services on the River Jade. Towed to Grimsby in January 1919 and returned to her owners in good condition. After a re-fit she took up the GCR service from Grimsby to Rotterdam. Transferred to AHL in 1935 for a service to Hamburg. In 1941 she was taken over by the Admiralty for work with 2 of her sisters as a convoy rescue vessel. Returned to AHL service in 1946 on the Hull-Rotterdam service. Withdrawn in May 1958 and towed to Nieuw Lekkerkerk for breaking up.
City of Bradford	1903	1,340	Built in 1903 by Earle's Shipbuilding for the Great Central Railway. Made her maiden voyage to Rotterdam before transferring to Scandinavian routes, eventually taking up service on the Grimsby – Hamburg route for which she was designed. In 1914 on passage to Hamburg and being unaware of the outbreak of war, she was intercepted off Heligoland and taken as a prize. Renamed Donau she was recovered by British forces in January 1919 and returned to Grimsby. Acquired by the LNER in 1923 she was transferred to AHL in 1935 but found to be surplus to requirements. Sold in 1936 to the Near East Shipping Co, London and renamed Hanne. The vessel was bombed and sunk off Malta in February 1942.
City of Leeds	1903	1,341	Built in 1903 by Earle's Shipbuilding for the Great Central Railway. A sister of City of Bradford, for service on the Grimsby – Hamburg route. Was in Hamburg when war broke out in 1914 and was taken as a 'seized prize'. She was recovered in early 1919 and towed to Grimsby, where she was refurbished entering service to Rotterdam pending resumption of the Hamburg service. Acquired by the LNER in 1923, and with her sister was transferred to AHL in 1935 but was also found to be surplus to requirements. The vessel was sold and scrapped in 1936 at Blyth, Northumberland.
SS Dewsbury	1910	1,631	Built in 1910 for the Great Central Railway for service on the Grimsby–Hamburg route The first vessel in a series of five sister ships which were all built by Earle's Shipbuilding at Hull; Acquired by LNER in 1923. Passed to AHL in 1935 and was converted to a Convoy Escort Vessel during the war. She returned to service post-war in late 1945 on the Harwich – Antwerp route with sister vessel Accrington replacing tonnage lost during the hostilities by the Harwich fleet. Passed to British Railways in 1948 she was finally withdrawn from service in January 1959 and was scrapped in May of that year.
Felixstowe	1918	905	Built in 1918 by Hawthorne & Co at Leith for the Harwich Continental Service of the Great Eastern Railway, transferring to LNER IN 1923.She passed into the AHL fleet in 1935 and maintained the Harwich service until 1948 when she was transferred to the Western Region of British Railways and placed on the Channel Island route. Later in 1948 she transferred to the Larne-Cairnryan route. From 1942 till 1946 she served as the Colchester. In 1950 sold to the Limerick SS Co and renamed Kylemore. Broken up at Rotterdam in 1957
Macclesfield	1914	1,018	Built in 1914 by Swan Hunter at Newcastle upon Tyne for the Great Central Railway. Remained in commercial service during the hostilities mainly serving the Netherlands. Resumed Grimsby – Antwerp service in 1919 and acquired by the LNER in 1923. Transferred to AHL in 1935. Resumed service in 1945 between Goole or Hull to Antwerp or Rotterdam. Passed to British Railways in 1948 and served until scrapped in 1958.
Stockport	1911	1,637	A sister of Accrington, which had been ordered to replace the Blackburn another sister which was lost within 3 months of delivery following a collision off Norfolk. Remained on commercial service from 1914 to 1918 and then did repatriation work in 1919 working for the Great Eastern Railway to Harwich. Transferred to the LNER in 1923. Converted to a convoy rescue ship in 1941 but subsequently lost in a torpedo attack in February 1943 whilst on passage to Iceland with survivors from an earlier convoy sinking. All on board were lost.

From Hull and Netherlands Steamship Company:
Ship	Launched	Tonnage GRT	Notes and references
SS Jervaulx Abbey	1907	1,188	Built by William Gray & Company, of West Hartlepool. One of four sisters which together operated a daily service to Rotterdam. Continued commercial service in 1914 but blockade of Holland caused vessel to be deployed as an armed boarding steamer. Returned to her owners in 1920 and transferred to LNER in 1923. Sold in 1936 to Far Eastern interests and renamed Houlee. Sunk by enemy action in 1938.
SS Melrose Abbey	1929	1,908	Built by Earle's Shipbuilding of Hull for Hull-Rotterdam service. The final ship to be built for the company. Following fall of Netherlands she operated in coastal convoys until conversion to a convoy rescue ship in 1941, but a grounding whilst on delivery voyage, including being struck by a mine whilst stranded, caused severe damage which, but for war scenario, would have been terminal. Was re-floated and repaired at Aberdeen and finally took up service in February 1942. Resumed Hull-Rotterdam service in March 1946. Renamed Melrose Abbey II in April 1958 to release name for a newbuilding. Withdrawn and laid up in January 1959. Sold to Greek cruising and ferry company Typaldos Bros and renamed Kriti. Served until 1966 when owners were liquidated and laid up in Piraeus where she was broken up in 1984.

From Wilson's and N.E.R.Shipping

Ship	Launched	Tonnage GRT	Notes and references
SS Hull	1907	1,132	Built by Caledon Shipbuilding & Engineering Company at Dundee. The first ship built for the new entity, her name was 'railway' rather than 'Wilson' and set a trend for the future. Ownership transferred to LNER in 1923 and joined AHL in 1935. Sold to Algerian interests and renamed Ville de Djidjelli in 1937 who converted her number 3 hold for wine carriage. Scrapped in 1955.
SS York	1907	1,132	A sister of Hull with similar history being renamed Ville de Bougie when also sold in 1937 with her sister. Withdrawn in 1956 when owners replaced her with a new ship of the same name.
SS Selby	1922	1,039	Built by J.Duthie Torry SB Co., of Aberdeen. Transferred to LNER in 1923 and joined in 1935. Scrapped at Odense in 1958.
SS Harrogate	1925	1,029	A sister of Selby except built at Leith by Ramage & Ferguson Ltd. Delivered for Hull-Hamburg route but also served Rotterdam and Antwerp when traffic required. Scrapped in 1958.

From London, Midland and Scottish Railway – Goole Steam Shipping Co.

Ship	Launched	Tonnage GRT	Notes and references
Aire	1931	1,108	Sister of Blyth also built by Cammell Laird for Goole-Rotterdam service. To AHL management in 1935 and served as an ammunition replenishment ship at Scapa Flow in World War II. Inbound from Antwerp to Goole in October 1958 when involved in a collision, was beached and subsequently salved but was found to be a total constructive loss.
Alt	1911	1,004	A sister of Hodder built by Wm.Dobson of Sunderland, Tyne and Wear for Goole–Hamburg, Goole-Rotterdam. Transferred to L.& N.W.R. and L.M.S in 1922 and 1923 respectively. Joined AJL in 1935. Sold out of lay-up and scrapped in Fife during 1954.
Besline	1928	43	Dumb Barge which was converted to a motor barge later. Scrapped with Besway in 1951.
Besway	1928	43	Dumb Barge- built as sister to Besline but not similarly motorised. Scrapped in 1951.
SS Blyth	1930	1,108	Built by Cammell Laird and Co., in Birkenhead and entered service from Goole to Ghent. Operated between Liverpool and Ireland in 1941. Post war she mainly worked on the Hull to Antwerp and Dunkirk route. Sold for scrapping in 1959.
Dearne	1924	1,043	Sister of Hebble except built at Vickers Shipbuilding and Engineering Ltd., of Barrow and entered Goole-Copenhagen service. In 1933 was fitted with refrigeration capacity and with her white hull was known with her running mate Rother as a 'butter boat' although they didn't carry butter exclusively. After D-Day in 1944 acted as an army meat supply ship between London and Rouen and Ostend, and transferred to similar work to and from the Mediterranean in 1946. Eventually sold and broken up in 1957.
Don	1924	1,038	Sister of Hebble except built like Dearne at Vickers Shipbuilding and Engineering Ltd., at Barrow. Employed initially on Goole-Copenhagen service in general trade and was converted to 'butter boat' in 1937 replacing the Rother. During World War II escaped serious consequences when on passage from Leith to Iceland she was bombed and the device failed to explode, and was removed safely in Reykjavík. Served as meat carrier between Malta and Italy in 1944-5 and was eventually sold for scrapping in November 1958.
Douglas	1907	950	Built by Clyde SB & E Co., in Port Glasgow.Had refrigerated capacity and served the Copenhagen route. Sold in April 1937 and renamed Stancourt and later in same year sold on to Greek owner G.M.Mavroleon and renamed Nepheligeretis. Renamed two times the following year Hermes and then Suzy. Damaged by an air attack during Spanish Civil War in 1939 and later that year having been renamed again to Ionna was sunk by a German submarine off Cape Finisterre.
Hebble	1924	1,040	Built by W.Beardmore and Co., at Dalmuir. The first of four sister vessels for the Goole services, all were replacement vessels for war losses of the same name. Requisioned by the Admiralty in 1940 with the Goole fleet. In 1945 chartered by Bristol Steam Shipping Company to supplement their fleet. Returned to Goole-Antwerp service in 1946. Grounded off River Elbe in February 1947 and suffered rudder and propeller damage. Suffered damage following an accident whilst in dry dock in Immingham in January 1953. Withdrawn in 1959 and sold for scrap.
Hodder	1910	1,016	A sister of Dearne except built by Wm. Dobson of Sunderland for the Lancashire and Yorkshire Railway Company for service on the Goole – Hamburg route. Converted like Mersey as a cable layer for the Post Office in 1915 based at Scapa Flow and laid cables to all the Orkney naval installations from the shore base HMS Imperieuse. Cable laying work in Pentland Firth area carried out. A special cable was laid to a floating buoy for the Home Fleet flagship which could be slipped when the vessel went to sea. The vessel's work was considered very important and didn't generally receive the deserved credit. Transferred to LNWR, LMS and AHL in 1922, 1923 and 1935 respectively. In 1946 transferred to Holyhead-Dublin service and was finally scrapped in 1956 at Dunstan-on-Tyne by Clayton & Davie.
Irwell	1906	1,040	A sister of Mersey built for Lancashire and Yorkshire Railway Rotterdam service. Transferred to LNWR, LMS, and AHL in 1922, 1923 and 1935 respectively. Spent much of World War II in Icelandic waters acting as a naval supply ship. Transferred to Larne-Loch Ryan service in 1946 and scrapped 1954 on the River Tyne.
Mersey	1906	1,037	A sister of Irwell built for Lancashire & Yorkshire Railway by Swan, Hunter & Wigham Richardson and entered service between Goole-Hull-Rotterdam. Seconded to Great Western Railway in 1915 for Weymouth-Channel Islands service but switched to cable laying activity in 1917 following the loss of the Post Office's vessel Monarch. Both she and Hodder were released back to their owners in 1920 and she was transferred to LNWR, LMS and the AHL in 1922, 1923 and 1935 respectively. Sunk by a magnetic mine in 1940 off Kent in the English Channel.
Ouse	1911	1,004	The 1,004 grt sister of Hodder built by Wm.Dobson of Sunderland for the Lancashire & Yorkshire Railway Company's service from Goole to Hamburg. Taken over by Admiralty in 1917 and converted to a Q-ship and renamed HMS Rule. In the later part of World War I carried stores from Gibraltar to Corfu. In 1922, 1923 and 1935 transferred to LNWR, LMS and AHL. Sunk 8 August 1940 after a collision with SS Rye in convoy.
Rother	1914	986	A sister of Dearne except built at Clyde SB & E Co., Port Glasgow. Delivered with a white hull for the Goole-Copenhagen service. Transferred to LNWR, LMS, and AHL in 1922, 1923 and 1935 and re-opened the Copenhagen service in October 1945. Ownership changed again in 1948 to British Transport Commission and finally scrapped in 1956 at Dunstan-on-Tyne by Clayton & Davie.
Rye	1924	1,048	Sister of Hebble. Transferred to AHL in 1935. Based at Weymouth, Dorset in 1940 which was civil dispersal point for French evacuations. Whilst taking evasive action during an attack she hit and sank the owners' Ouse. Was torpedoed off Cromer, Norfolk in 1941 then shelled and lost with all hands.
Transport			
West Riding	1894	103	Multi purpose water, coal bunkering vessel and fire float. Sold for scrapping in 1947.

== Rationalisation and war losses ==
A.H.L. suffered only relatively light losses to its fleet during World War II. Vessels lost were "Stockport", "Mersey", "Ouse" and "Rye".

Elsewhere, losses had been considerable and particularly badly hit were the Harwich fleet of the LNER. Consequently, the "Dewsbury" and "Accrington" were transferred in late 1945 and 1946 to that base on a permanent basis.

By 1948, the A.H.L. fleet had been reduced to:

- Based at Goole and all ex-LMS – Aire / Alt / Blyth / Dearne / Don / Hebble / Hodder / Irwell / Rother.
- Based at Hull – Bury / Harrogate / Melrose Abbey / Selby.

By the end of 1962 the fleet had declined to:

- Ships with passenger carrying capability – Bolton Abbey / Melrose Abbey / Whitby Abbey / Byland Abbey / Kirkham Abbey .
- Cargo only vessels – Darlington / Harrogate / Leeds / Selby / Wakefield / York.

== New building programme ==
Ship	Launched	Tonnage GRT	Notes and references
MV Whitby Abbey	1954	1,197	Built by Hall, Russell & Company at Aberdeen. The ship was ordered by British Transport Commission and transferred to Hull and Netherlands S.S.Co. ownership. In 1957 ownership was transferred to AHL Ltd. On closure of Hull-Antwerp service in February 1968 the vessel was laid up and then sold to a company in the Philippines and renamed West Lyte. In July 1974 she capsized during discharge operations at Manila. She changed ownership in 1976 and was eventually withdrawn from service in 1990.
MV Fountains Abbey	1954	1,197	A sister of Whitby Abbey with same ownership pattern. These two vessels were the last to be registered in this way. All following new vessels were registered with AHL Ltd. as their owners. Served on various routes from Goole and Hull but experienced a fire in February 1962 whilst on passage from Bremen to Hull. The vessel was towed into IJmuiden by Bureau Wijsmuller's tugs Titan, Simson and Stentor but was declared a constructive total loss.
MV Kirkham Abbey	1956	1,372	Built by Austin & Pickersgill Ltd., of Sunderland. Entered Goole-Copenhagen service. She had a grey hull denoting refrigerated capacity. Vessel transferred with the route to Ellerman's Wilson Line Ltd. In 1965, and again in 1967, she switched to that line's London-Aarhus-Copenhagen service. Renamed Ariosto in February 1968. Sold with her sister to Maldives Shipping Ltd. in October 1970, and was renamed Maldive Importer; She was broken up at Gadani Beach in 1983.
MV Byland Abbey	1957	1,372	A sister of Kirkham Abbey, and transferred with her to Ellerman's Wilson Line Ltd. in 1965 followed by the same switch to the London route. Renamed Angelo in 1968. Sold with sister to Maldives Shipping Ltd., in October 1970. Scrapped at Galdani Beach in 1980.
MV Bolton Abbey	1958	2,740; 3,169	Built by Brooke Marine Ltd., at Lowestoft for the Hull-Rotterdam service replacing the Bury. Lengthened over the winter of 1967/8. Her mast and derricks were removed to improve container intake and handling ability. Vessel laid up at Hull following closure of the Hull-Rotterdam service in November 1971 and was sold with her sister to Chion Shipping Company in Greece in 1972, and renamed Ionia Express. Was further renamed Capalonga by Offshore Diving & Financial Inc., of Panama in 1974. She was converted to a deep diving oil pipeline repair and laying vessel mainly based in the Adriatic during 1975 by new owners Sub Sea Oil Services S.p.a. and finally stripped of her diving equipment and scrapped in 1983.
MV Melrose Abbey	1959	2,741; 3,169	A sister of Bolton Abbey and entered same Hull-Rotterdam service. Was similarly lengthened and modified at Smiths Dock Company in North Shields in November 1967. Made final AHL sailing on the Hull-Rotterdam service on 29 November 1971 and was laid up on 1 December. Sold with sister to Chion Shipping Company and renamed Aegeon Express in 1972 serving until July 1978 when she was again laid up and was towed to Piraeus in August 1980 for breaking up.
MV Wakefield	1958	1,113	Built by A & J Inglis at Pointhouse for service out of Goole. Early 1968 switched to Hull-Antwerp. Sold in 1972 to Medship of Famagusta and renamed Gulf Coast. Sold on to Taj Shipping also of Famagusta in 1974 and whilst en-route Ipswich-Tema in 1976 grounded, caught fire and suffered an explosion becoming a constructive total loss.
MV Leeds	1959	1,113	A sister of Wakefield based initially at Goole but also switched to Hull in 1968. Performed the final sailing for AHL on the Hull-Antwerp service in November 1971 before being laid up. Sold to Medship, Famagusta in 1972 and renamed "Gulf Sea", also being sold on to other Famagusta interests in 1974. Subsequently renamed Orwell Quay in 1975, Star in 1976 and Sirius in 1978. Sold again in 1982 being renamed Serius and finally went off the register in 1990 and was broken up.
MV York	1959	1,113	A further sister of Wakefield except that she has refrigeration capability in her lower hold allowing her to perform as a relief ship on the Copenhagen service. Laid up in Hull in 1968 and was sold to interests in Singapore in 1969 and was renamed Cherry Bagus. Sold on in 1972 within Singapore and kept her name. Broken up in Kaohsiung in 1985.
MV Darlington	1958	963	Built by James Lamont & Co., of Port Glasgow for service out of Hull. In September 1965 she operated from Folkestone to Boulogne in British Railways livery and in 1968 acted as a relief ship on the London Midland Region's Holyhead-Dún Laoghaire and Heysham-Belfast routes. In 1969 she was based at Southampton until finally returning to her home base in 1970 on the Hull-Antwerp service. Sold in August 1971 and renamed Gulf Sky by Sky Enterprises Ltd., and registered in Ipswich but managed from Famagusta. Sold again in 1977 and renamed Abadan, sold one more in 1978 renamed Petros P and finally Ekaterini P also in 1978. In March 1980 whilst on passage from Rouen to Lattakia her cargo shifted and she took shelter in Brest where she was abandoned. The French authorities unloaded and sold the cargo to offset port costs. The vessel was towed to sea on 26 January 1982 and sunk by the French Navy.
MV Harrogate	1958	963	A sister of Darlington. In 1965 on closure of the Goole-Rotterdam service she was switched to the Holyhead base of the London Midland region and ownership transferred to the British Railways Board. During the winter of 1967/8 she was converted for the carriage of containers and in January 1968 inaugurated the Holyhead-Dublin container service. In November 1969 she inaugurated a service from Fishguard to Waterford, but was switched back to Holyhead-Dublin in 1972. Later in 1972 she was sold and renamed Stork, and in 1974 becoming Alouette. On passage from Rochester, Kent to Beirut in 1977 she was abandoned on fire in the English Channel and was towed gutted into Cherbourg. Later that year she was towed to Piraeus and laid up. She was sold once more in 1978 and renamed Dimitrios and repaired at Perama. Having changed her name to Dimitris under the same ownership she sprang a leak off Crete on 24 September 1981 and sank.
MV Selby	1959	963	A further sister of Darlington. Transferred to Heysham when the Goole-Rotterdam service ceased. Converted for container operations in 1968 for Heysham and Holyhead ports. Moved to Southampton in January 1971 to replace Winchester on the Southampton-Jersey service and in same month grounded and was blown ashore in a gale at London Bay, Jersey. Towed by tug Meeching to Southampton on 2 February for repairs. In 1974 sold to Pounds Marine Shipping Co. of Havant and was re-sold later in same year. Renamed Raven when sold again in 1976 to a company registered in Panama. Within a year she had changed her name again to Jean R and was towed into Cherbourg whilst on passage from Huelva to Rotterdam with her engine room flooded. In 1980 she was sold to Greek interests and renamed Victory. The next 3 years saw her change owners a further two times and was renamed Agios Nikolaos in 1983. In 1990 she was sold yet again to a Piraeus interest but trace lost after that transaction.

== Hull to New Holland ferry service ==
On 1 January 1959 management of this River Humber ferry service was transferred to AHL from the British Transport Commission – Eastern Region.

The three paddle steamers also operated excursions voyages on the river in season.

Vessels in service at transfer of management

Ship	Launched	Tonnage GRT	Notes and references
Tattershall Castle	1934	550	Built by William Gray & Company of West Harlepool. Sold in July 1974
Wingfield Castle	1934	550	A sister to Tattershall Castle. Became reserve ship to "Lincoln Castle" in 1972 when service was reduced to a single ship. Performed her final sailing in March 1974 and sold in 1977 and renamed Brighton Belle
Lincoln Castle	1940	598	Built by A & J Inglis Ltd., of Pointhouse. Suffered boiler failure in 1978 and repair deemed uneconomic in view of anticipated opening of Humber Bridge in 1979

Additional vessel employed from 1974

Ship	Launched	Tonnage GRT	Notes and references
MV Farringford	1947	489	Built by William Denny & Brothers of Dumbarton for the Southern Railway's Lymington – Yarmouth, Isle of Wight service. Transferred to Southern Region of British Transport Commission in 1948. Towed to Hull for Humber service in 1974 by United Towing's Masterman where modifications were carried out before entering service. Transferred to Sealink UK Ltd. in 1979 and performed last ferry crossing on 26 June 1981 when ferry service closed.

== Bibliography ==
- Clegg, W.Paul; Styring, John S (1969). British Railways Shipping and Allied Fleets – The Post War Period. Newton Abbot: David & Charles. ISBN 0-7153-5140-0.
- Greenway, Ambrose (1986). A Century of North Sea Passenger Steamers. Shepperton: Ian Allan Publishing. ISBN 0-7110-1338-1.
- Haws, Duncan (1993). Merchant Fleets – Britain's Railway Steamers – Eastern & North Western Companies + Zeeland and Stena. Hereford: TCL Publications. ISBN 0-946378-22-3.
