= SS Dewsbury =

Commercial British vessel (1910–1959)

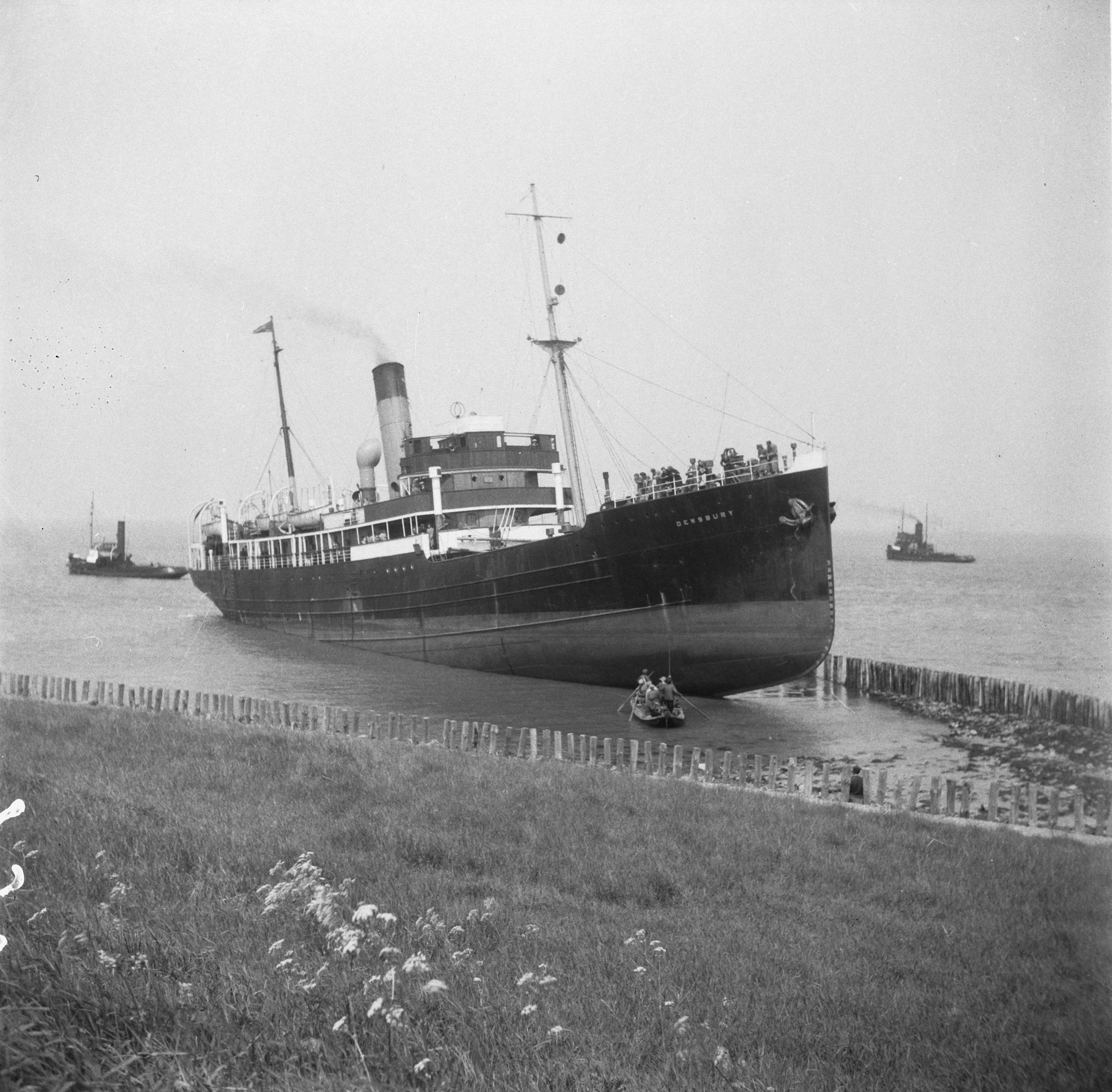

History
- Name: SS Dewsbury
- Operator: 1910–1923: Great Central Railway; 1923–1935: London and North Eastern Railway; 1935–1959: Associated Humber Lines
- Builder: Earle's Shipbuilding, Hull
- Launched: 14 April 1910
- Maiden voyage: 17 June 1910
- Out of service: February 1959
- Fate: Scrapped March 1959

General characteristics
- Tonnage: 1,631 gross register tons (GRT)
- Length: 265 feet (81 m)
- Beam: 36 feet (11 m)
- Depth: 17.4 feet (5.3 m)

SS Dewsbury was a passenger and cargo vessel built for the Great Central Railway in 1910.

== History ==
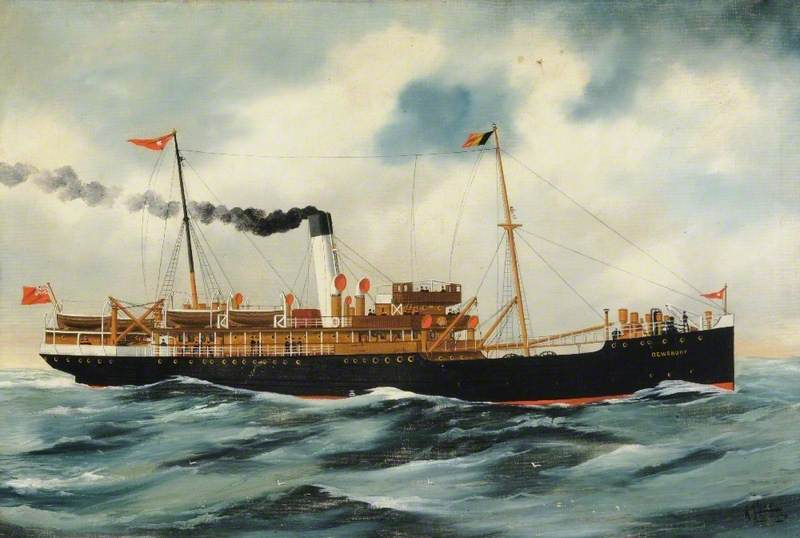
SS Dewsbury painted by A. J. Jansen, Antwerp in 1910

The ship was built by Earle's Shipbuilding of Hull and launched in 1910. She was one of an order for four ships, the others being Bury, Blackburn and Accrington. She undertook her maiden voyage from Grimsby to Antwerp on 17 June 1910 with Sir Alexander Henderson, chairman of the Great Central Railway and a number of the directors, and of the Humber Commercial Railway and Dock Company.

She was in Hamburg at the outbreak of the First World War, but managed to escape and returned safely to Grimsby.

In 1915 she was hired by the Great Western Railway during a dispute with its sailors and firemen over pay. She was deployed on the Fishguard to Cork service.

In 1923 she transferred to the London and North Eastern Railway. In October 1928 she collided with the German steamer Lulealf at Hamburg, resulting in damage to both vessels.

In 1935 she transferred to Associated Humber Lines. On 25 October 1936 the Captain and crew rescued the crew of the Dutch motor vessel Albion in the North Sea. Captain A.J.E. Snowden and nine members of the crew were recognized for their gallantry in risking their own lives in terrific seas.

She was scrapped in March 1959.
