= SS Ollanta =

Steamship on Lake Titicaca in Peru

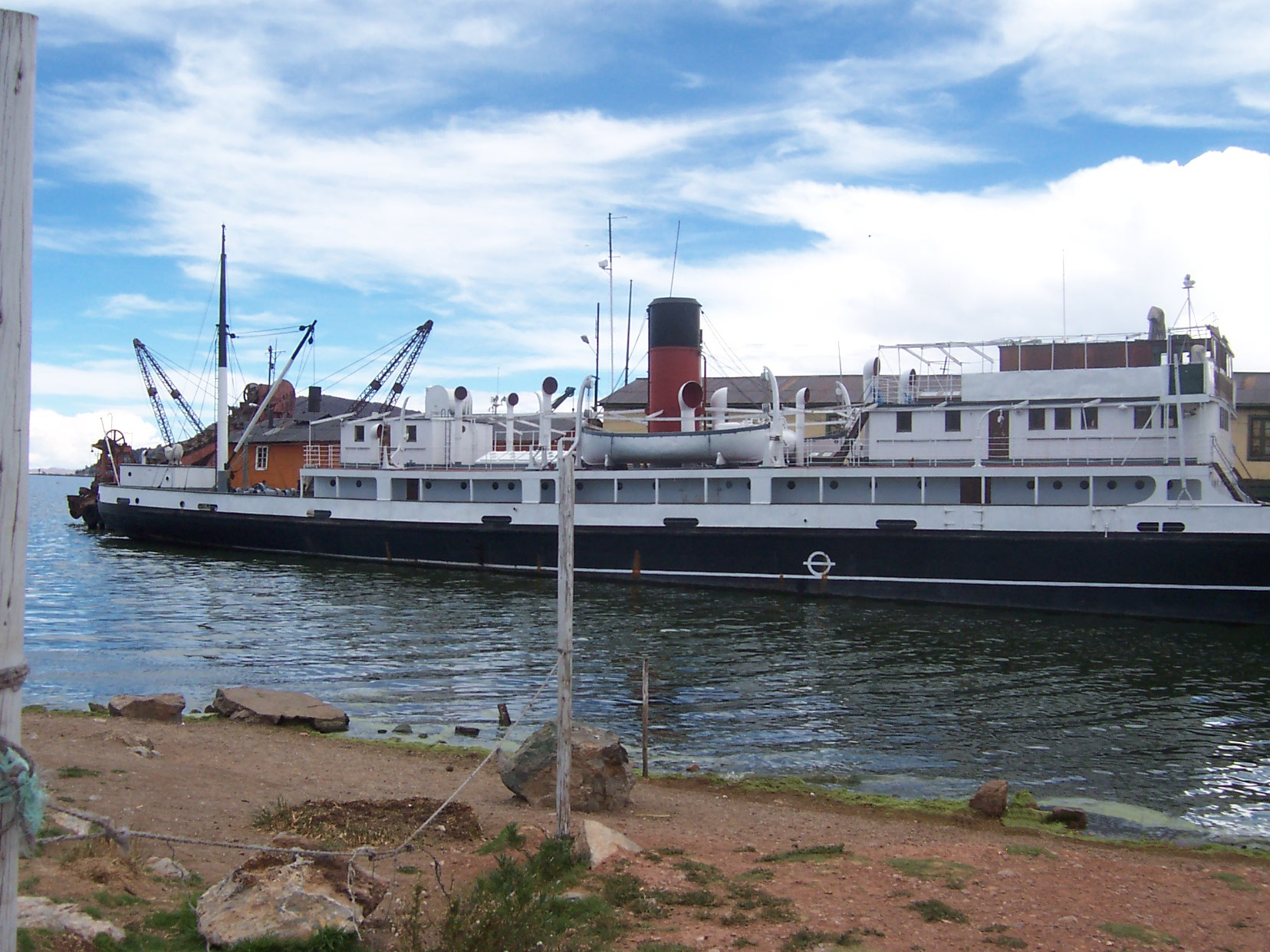
- Ollanta berthed at Puno in 2003

History
- Name: SS Ollanta
- Owner: The Peruvian Corporation (1930–75); ENAFER (1975–1990s); PeruRail (1990s–present)
- Port of registry: (Peru) Puno
- Route: formerly across Lake Titicaca
- Ordered: 1929
- Builder: Earle's Shipbuilding, Hull, England
- Yard number: 679
- Launched: 1931
- In service: 1931
- Status: in charter service

General characteristics
- Type: passenger and cargo ferry
- Tonnage: 2,200 tons
- Length: 260 ft (79 m)
- Beam: 35.6 ft (10.9 m)
- Installed power: four oil-fired steam engines
- Propulsion: screw
- Speed: 14.5 knots (26.9 km/h)
- Capacity: currently 70 passengers; formerly 66 1st class passengers, 20 2nd class passengers & 950 tons freight

SS Ollanta, built in England in 1931, is a steamship on Lake Titicaca in Peru.

== History ==
The Peruvian Corporation, a UK-owned company, had controlled Peru's railways and lake shipping since 1890. Traffic had outstripped the capacity of the corporation's hitherto largest lake steamer SS Inca (1,809 tons), the smaller SS Coya (546 tons) and ageing Yavari and Yapura. Accordingly, in 1929, the corporation ordered the Ollanta to work along with the Inca.

Earle's Shipbuilding of Kingston upon Hull on the Humber in England built Ollanta as a "knock down" ship; that is, they assembled her in their shipyard with bolts and nuts, marked each part with a number, and then disassembled her into many hundreds of pieces and sent her to Peru in kit form. The pieces were shipped by sea from King George Dock in Hull to Mollendo on the Pacific Ocean coast of Peru. They were then delivered by rail to Puno on Lake Titicaca, where Ollanta was finally riveted together and launched.

Earle's put the engineer William Smale in charge of reassembling and launching Ollanta. At 2,200 tons and 260 feet (79 m) long, Ollanta was larger than any previous ship on Lake Titicaca. Titicaca, therefore, had no slipway big enough to build her, so one of Smale's first tasks was to have one built.

A major ship had not been launched on Lake Titicaca since the Inca 25 years earlier in 1905, so no local suitably equipped workshops or skilled craftsmen were available for Smale to recruit. So, Smale made the best of local labour and improvised machine tools from railway equipment. Earle's sent a skilled team from England to help launch the ship, but Smale got Ollanta completed before the team arrived, and launched the ship using his unaided local workmen.

Ollanta had the capacity for 950 tons of freight, 66 first-class passengers on the upper deck of her deckhouse, and 20 second-class passengers in the forward part of the ship. Her four oil-fired steam engines gave her a top speed of 14.5 knots (26.9 km/h; 16.7 mph). She was the Peruvian Corporation's most luxurious steamer on the lake and the culmination of nearly 70 years' development of Titicaca steamers since the building of Yavari started in 1862.

In 1975, the Peruvian Corporation was nationalized and Ollanta's ownership passed to the state railway company ENAFER. She now belongs to ENAFER's successor PeruRail, which has refurbished her to carry a total of 70 passengers. Ollanta is no longer in scheduled service, but PeruRail leases her to be chartered for tourist cruises.
