= SS Inca =

Steamship

History
- Name: SS Inca
- Owner: The Peruvian Corporation (1905–75); ENAFER (1975–94)
- Port of registry: (Peru) Puno
- Route: formerly across Lake Titicaca
- Ordered: 1905
- Builder: Earle's Shipbuilding, Hull, England
- Cost: £22,285
- Yard number: 489
- Launched: 1905
- In service: 1905
- Fate: Scrapped 1994

General characteristics
- Type: passenger & cargo ferry
- Tonnage: 1,809 tons
- Length: 220 ft (67 m)
- Beam: 30 ft (9.1 m)
- Installed power: steam
- Propulsion: screw

SS Inca was a steamship on Lake Titicaca in Peru.

== History ==
The Peruvian Corporation, a UK-owned company, had controlled Peru's railways and lake shipping since 1890. Traffic had outstripped the capacity of the corporation's hitherto largest lake steamer SS Coya (546 tons) and ageing Yavari and Yapura. Accordingly, in 1904, the corporation ordered the Inca, which at 1,809 tons was by far the lake's largest ship to date.

Earle's Shipbuilding of Kingston upon Hull on the Humber in England built Inca as a "knock down" ship; that is, they assembled her in their shipyard with bolts and nuts, marked each part with a number and then disassembled her into many hundreds of pieces and then sent her to Peru in kit form. The pieces were shipped by sea to South America and then by rail to Lake Titicaca, where Inca was finally riveted together and launched. Each part had to fit within a packing crate no more than 10 feet (3 m) wide and 11 feet (3.4 m) high to fit within the railway's loading gauge, and weigh no more than 12 tons to be within the railway's axle loading.

In the 1920s, Earle's supplied a new bottom for the ship, which also was delivered in kit form. Traffic continued to increase, so in 1929, the corporation ordered an even larger ship from Earle's, SS Ollanta, to work along with the Inca.

In 1975, the Peruvian Corporation was nationalised and Inca's ownership passed to the state railway company ENAFER. She survived in serviceable condition, but in 1994, Inca was scrapped.
