= SS Coya =

Steamship on Lake Titicaca, Peru

Coordinates: 15.8245691469294°S 70.00222928517691°W

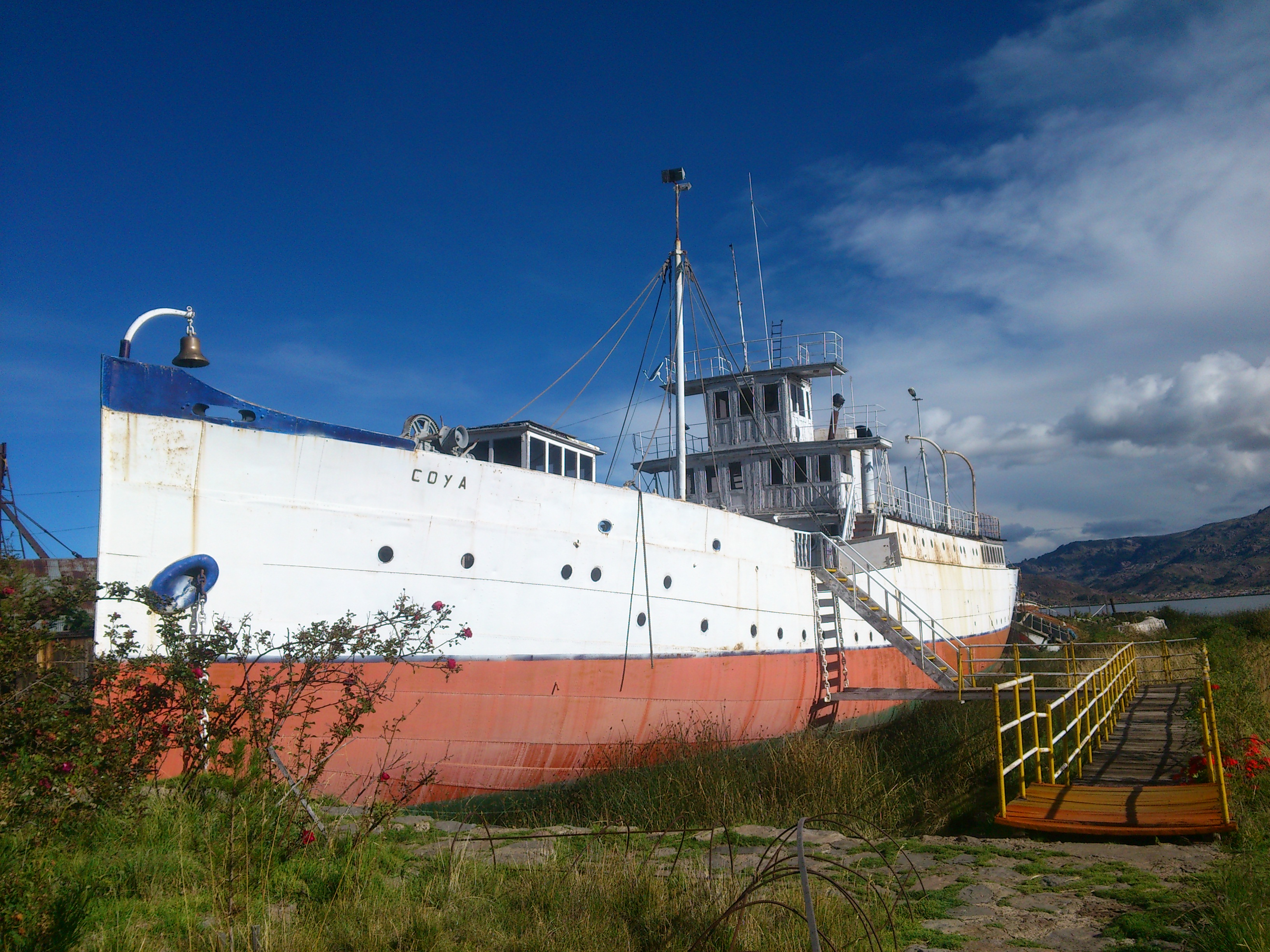
- SS Coya

History
- Name: SS Coya
- Port of registry: (Peru) Puno
- Route: formerly across Lake Titicaca
- Ordered: 1892
- Builder: William Denny and Brothers, Dumbarton, Scotland
- Yard number: 463
- Launched: 1893
- In service: 1893
- Fate: beached by floodwater 1984
- Status: restored since 2001

General characteristics
- Type: restaurant ship; former passenger & cargo ferry
- Tonnage: 546 tons
- Length: 170 ft (52 m)
- Beam: 26 ft (7.9 m)
- Installed power: steam
- Propulsion: screw

SS Coya is a 19th-century iron-hulled steamship on Lake Titicaca in Peru. After a long history carrying freight and passengers she is currently a floating restaurant.

== History ==
Peru already had two steamships on Lake Titicaca; Yavari and Yapura. Increasing traffic had outstripped their cargo and passenger capacities so the Peruvian Corporation, a UK-owned company that had taken over Peru's railways and lake shipping in 1890, ordered a much larger ship to supplement them. Coya, at 546 tons and 170 feet (52 m) long, was the largest steamship on Lake Titicaca when she was launched in 1893.

William Denny and Brothers of Dumbarton on the River Clyde, Scotland built Coya in 1892 in "knock down" form; that is, they assembled her with bolts and nuts at the shipyard, dismantled her into thousands of parts small enough to transport, shipped the parts to Lake Titicaca where she was reassembled with rivets and launched in 1893.

Strictly speaking, Denny's yard was on the River Leven, a tributary of the River Clyde, though all ships built on tributaries of the Clyde tend to be classed as "Clyde-built". The famous clipper, Cutty Sark, was completed in the same yard as the Coya was built. Former director of the shipyard, Sir Eddie Denny, related that when the Coya was first re-assembled at Puno, and her boilers fired up, the altitude meant that she would not be able to maintain her contracted speed across the full length of the lake without burning through excessive amounts of coal. This was a real problem. Contracts would typically contain penalty clauses with financial punishments for the builder for every quarter of a knot that the ship fell below its contracted speed. There would also be a cut-off point where the prospective purchaser could reject the ship entirely. Denny's had already committed substantial sums to building the ship in Dumbarton, taking it to pieces again then transporting it all the way to Lake Titicaca and re-assembling. One of the directors had the bright idea of persuading the directors of the prospective buyers, the Peruvian Corporation, that a nice day out could be had if they ran half the intended route to an island in the middle of the lake, where they would stop to have a sumptuous lunch, courtesy of Denny's, after which they would steam all the way back to Puno and it would be just like completing the full-distance run. This was agreed and Coya raced out to the island, deposited the directors of both companies, then sailed into a nearby inlet where a supply of coal had been bunkered a day or so before. As the directors enjoyed their lunch, Coya was topped up with enough coal to make the run back to Puno in good time.

Lake traffic continued to grow, so the Corporation added the much larger SS Inca (1,809 tons) in 1905 and SS Ollanta (2,200 tons) in 1930. However, Coya continued in service on the lake.

In 1975 the Peruvian Corporation was nationalised and Coya's ownership passed to the state railway company ENAFER. In 1984 Coya was grounded by flooding of the lake that then receded and left her beached on dry land. In 2001 she was rescued, restored and refloated as a restaurant.

Coya may be the oldest surviving Denny-built steamship in the world.

== See also ==
- List of ships built by William Denny and Brothers
