= SS Blackburn =

History
- Name: SS Blackburn
- Operator: Great Central Railway
- Port of registry: (United Kingdom)
- Builder: Earle's Shipbuilding, Hull
- Launched: 8 September 1910
- Fate: Collision 8 December 190

General characteristics
- Tonnage: 1,634 gross register tons (GRT)
- Length: 265 feet (81 m)
- Beam: 36 feet (11 m)
- Depth: 17.4 feet (5.3 m)

SS Blackburn was a passenger and cargo vessel built for the Great Central Railway in 1910.

== History ==
The ship was built by Earle's Shipbuilding of Hull and launched on 8 September 1910 by Miss Joyce Evelyn Barwick of Grimsby. She was one of an order for four ships, the others being Dewsbury, Accrington and Bury. She was built with accommodation for 100 first-class, 10 second-class and 300 third-class passengers.

She had a very short career with the Great Central Railway as on 8 December 1910 she was in collision with the London steamer Rook off Sheringham, Norfolk. Twenty-eight crew and twenty-nine passengers escaped in three lifeboats. The wreck was located five days later and found to be lying in three fathoms of water. It was marked with a buoy.
