= SS Stockport (1911) =

History
- Name: SS Stockport
- Operator: 1912–1923: Great Central Railway; 1923–1935: London and North Eastern Railway; 1935–1943: Associated Humber Lines
- Port of registry: (United Kingdom) Grimsby
- Builder: Earle's Shipbuilding, Hull
- Launched: 15 May 1911
- Fate: Sunk 23 February 1943

General characteristics
- Tonnage: 1,631 gross register tons (GRT)
- Length: 265 feet (81 m)
- Beam: 36 feet (11 m)
- Depth: 17.4 feet (5.3 m)

SS Stockport was a passenger and cargo vessel built for the Great Central Railway in 1912. During the Second World War she served as a convoy rescue ship until a U-boat sank her in February 1943.

== History ==
The ship was built by Earle's Shipbuilding of Hull and launched in 1912. In 1923 she passed into the ownership of the London and North Eastern Railway, and in 1935 to the Associated Humber Lines.

On 11 August 1937 she was in collision with the Hull steam trawler Lady Beryl in the Humber off Immingham in thick fog. Both vessels were damaged but not below the water line.

Her convoy rescue service began on 22 October 1941. She rescued 413 survivors from sunken ships while sailing with sixteen convoys, including convoy SC 107.

On 21 February 1943 she was part of convoy ON 166 and went to the assistance of Empire Trader which had straggled behind the convoy in the Atlantic Ocean north of the Azores, Portugal. After U-92 torpedoed and damaged Empire Trader, Stockport rescued all 106 crew men before HMCS Dauphin scuttled Empire Trader following orders received from the Admiralty. However, Stockport had itself now fallen. She was attempting to regain the convoy when on 23 February U-604 torpedoed and sank her at (47°22′N 34°10′W) with the loss of all her crew and the survivors that she had rescued from other vessels.

She is commemorated every February in a parade and commemoration service organised by Hazel Grove Royal Naval Association.
