= SS City of Bradford =

Coordinates: 31°57′N 25°26′E

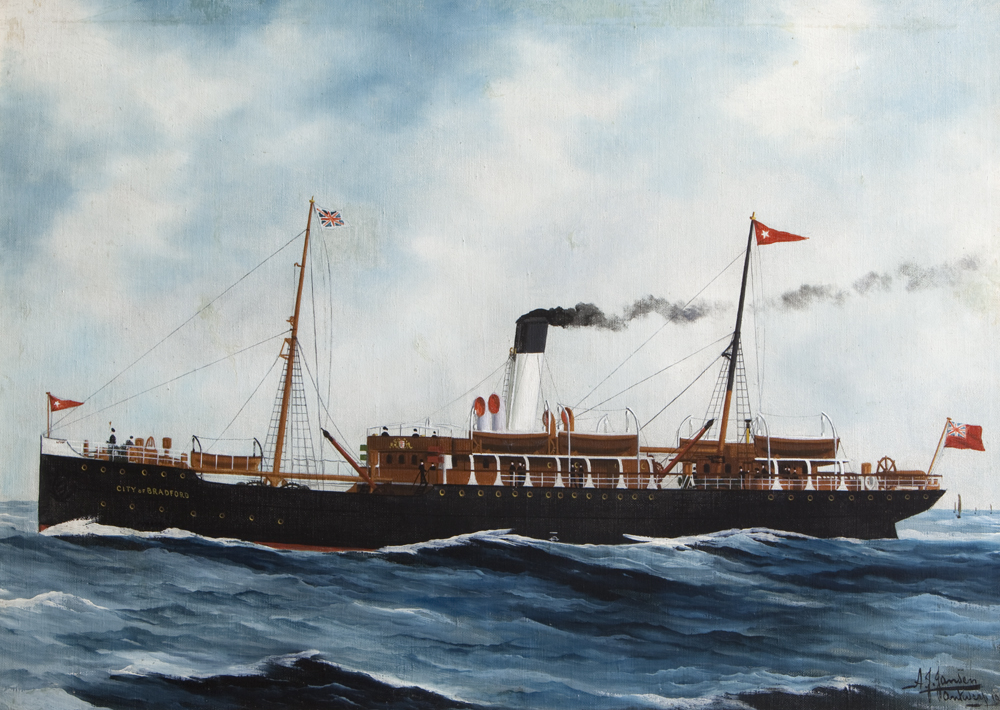
- Painting of City of Bradford by AS Jansen

History
- Name: 1903: City of Bradford; 1916: Donau; 1919: City of Bradford; 1936: Hanne
- Namesake: 1903: Bradford; 1916: Danube
- Owner: 1903: Great Central Railway; 1923: LNER; 1936: Near East Shipping Co
- Operator: 1903: FM Barwick; 1914: (German Empire) Imperial German Navy; 1919: FM Barwick; 1923: Joseph Man; 1933: Edward Rutter; 1936: Louis Sangursky
- Port of registry: 1903: (United Kingdom) Grimsby; 1936: (United Kingdom) London
- Route: Grimsby – Hamburg
- Builder: Earle's Shipbldg & Eng Ltd, Hull
- Yard number: 483
- Launched: 23 July 1903
- Completed: September 1903
- Reclassified: WW1: repair ship, tender ship, escort ship
- Identification: UK official number 118913; code letters VFRM (until 1933); call sign MCXZ (1934 onward)
- Fate: Sunk by air attack 1942

General characteristics
- Type: Passenger ship
- Tonnage: 1903: 1,345 GRT, 731 NRT; 1913: 1,349 GRT, 739 NRT; 1923: 1,360 GRT, 677 NRT
- Length: 256.5 ft (78.2 m)
- Beam: 34.5 ft (10.5 m)
- Draught: 17 ft 10 in (5.44 m)
- Depth: 15.7 ft (4.8 m)
- Decks: 1
- Installed power: 356 NHP
- Propulsion: triple-expansion steam engine
- Speed: 14 knots (26 km/h)
- Sensors & processing systems: submarine signalling
- Armament: DEMS
- Notes: sister ship: City of Leeds

SS City of Bradford was a British passenger and cargo steamship that was built in Yorkshire in 1903, renamed Donau in 1916, reverted to City of Bradford in 1919 and became Hanne in 1936.

In the First World War the Imperial German Navy captured her and used her as an auxiliary ship. In the Second World War she was sunk by an air attack in the Mediterranean in 1942.

== Building ==
In 1903 Earle's Shipbuilding and Engineering of Hull, Yorkshire built a pair of ferries for the Great Central Railway. City of Leeds was launched on 8 June 1903. Jane Robinson, wife of the Great Central's chief mechanical engineer John G. Robinson, launched City of Leeds' sister ship City of Bradford on 23 July.

City of Bradford' registered length was 256.5 ft (78.2 m), her beam was 34.5 ft (10.5 m) and her depth was 15.7 ft (4.8 m). As built, her tonnages were 1,341 GRT and 735 NRT. She was registered at Grimsby. Her UK official number was 118913 and her code letters were VFRM.

== GCR and LNER career ==
City of Leeds and City of Bradford ran scheduled services between Grimsby and Hamburg. In 1913 City of Bradford's tonnages were revised to 1,349 GRT and 739 NRT.

When the First World War began at the end of July 1914, City of Leeds was caught unawares. The German Navy captured her off Heligoland and took her to Hamburg as a prize. She was converted into a naval repair ship, then a tender ship and finally an escort ship. By 1916 she had been renamed Donau. In 1919 she was returned to Grimsby and her name was reverted to City of Bradford.

In 1923 City of Bradford's tonnages were revised again to 1,360 GRT and 677 NRT. In the same year the Great Central became part of the new London and North Eastern Railway (LNER), and City of Bradford became part of its fleet.

By 1930 City of Bradford was equipped for wireless telegraphy and her navigation equipment included submarine signalling. In 1934 the call sign MCXZ superseded her code letters. From 1935 Associated Humber Lines managed her.

== Near East Shipping Company ==
In 1936 the LNER sold City of Bradford to the Near East Shipping Co, which was managed from Haifa in Palestine. Her new owner renamed the ship Hanne and registered her in London.

In the Second World War Hanne was in the Mediterranean. In November 1940 she was part of Convoy AS 5 from Piraeus to Port Said. In February 1942 she was part of Convoy AT 29 from Alexandria to Tobruk.

Convoy AT 29 comprised only three merchant ships: the Palestinian Alisa, Danish Bintang, and Hanne. It had no naval escort. The three ships left Alexandria on 20 February 1942. Two days later German aircraft attacked the convoy, sinking Hanne off the coast of Egypt and Bintang off the coast of Libya. Four members of Hanne's crew and 19 members of Bintang's crew were killed.

== Bibliography ==
- Duckworth, Christian; Langmuir, Graham (1968) [1948]. Railway and other Steamers. Prescot: T Stephenson and Sons. ISBN 978-0901314123.
- Harnack, Edwin P (1930) [1903]. All About Ships & Shipping (3rd ed.). London: Faber and Faber.
