= SS Bury =

History
- Name: SS Bury
- Operator: 1911–1923: Great Central Railway; 1923–1935: London and North Eastern Railway; 1935–1958: Associated Humber Lines
- Port of registry: (United Kingdom)
- Builder: Earle's Shipbuilding, Hull
- Launched: 3 November 1910
- Completed: January 1911
- Out of service: June 1958
- Fate: Scrapped 1958

General characteristics
- Tonnage: 1,634 gross register tons (GRT)
- Length: 265 feet (81 m)
- Beam: 36 feet (11 m)
- Depth: 17.4 feet (5.3 m)

SS Bury was a passenger and cargo vessel completed for Britain's Great Central Railway in 1911. Bury was employed as a packet boat for the company between Harwich and the Hook of Holland for most of her career. During the Second World War Bury was outfitted as a convoy rescue ship.

== History ==
Bury was built by Earle's Shipbuilding of Hull and launched in 1910. She was one of an order for four ships, the others being Dewsbury, Blackburn and Accrington.

In 1914 she was in Hamburg at the outbreak of the First World War and the crew were taken prisoner of war and detained until the end of hostilities. The stewardesses were released early in 1914 after representation of the Railway Company through the American Consul in Hamburg.

1923 she transferred to the London and North Eastern Railway and then in 1935 to Associated Humber Lines. On 23 July 1936 she was in collision with the German steamer Virgilia in the River Elbe. The Virgilia sank and the crew of the Bury rescued the German crew.

In 1941 Bury was taken up by the Rescue Service for conversion as a convoy rescue ship. She was suited for conversion for rescue service as she had a low freeboard and plenty of accommodation. She was fitted with deck platforms for landing survivors, a well-stocked sickbay with two surgeon-doctors and a sick-berth attendant, and supplies of blankets and clothing. She was equipped with two motor lifeboats, and carried HF/DF equipment for locating ships in distress. Entering service in December 1941 Bury sailed with 48 convoys and rescued 237 survivors during the war.

In May 1942, on her 4th voyage as a rescue ship, Bury left Liverpool as part of Convoy ON 92 which was attacked by Wolfpack Hecht on 11 May 1942. She collected 178 survivors from three different ships in the convoy, taking them to St John's in Newfoundland.

The ship was sent for scrapping in June 1958.
