= SS City of Leeds =

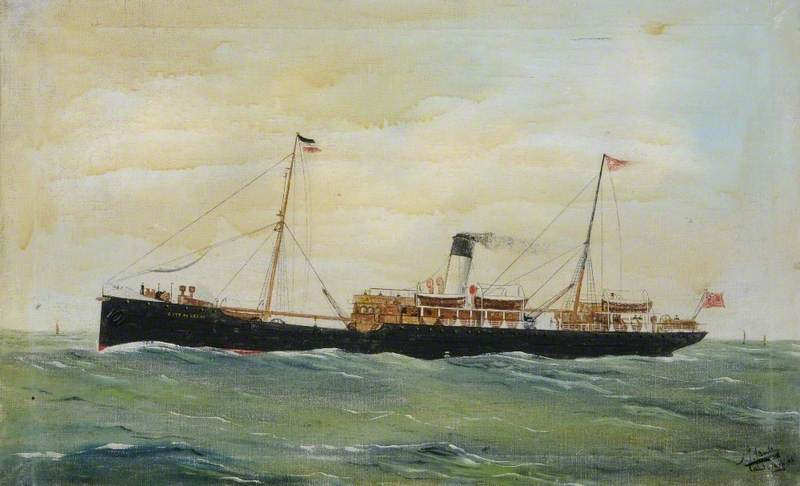
- Painting of City of Leeds by AS Jansen

History
- Name: City of Leeds
- Namesake: Leeds
- Owner: 1903: Great Central Railway; 1923: LNER
- Operator: 1903: FM Barwick; 1914: (German Empire) Imperial German Navy; 1919: FM Barwick; 1923: Joseph Man; 1933: Edward Rutter
- Port of registry: (United Kingdom) Grimsby
- Route: Grimsby – Hamburg
- Builder: Earle's Shipbldg & Eng Ltd, Hull
- Yard number: 482
- Launched: 8 June 1903
- Sponsored by: July 1903
- Reclassified: WW1: mine depot ship
- Identification: UK official number 113248; code letters VDWQ (until 1933); call sign MFTZ (1934 onward)
- Fate: Scrapped 1937

General characteristics
- Type: passenger ship
- Tonnage: 1904: 1,341 GRT, 733 NRT; 1913: 1,349 GRT, 739 NRT; 1923: 1,361 GRT, 678 NRT
- Length: 256.5 ft (78.2 m)
- Beam: 34.5 ft (10.5 m)
- Depth: 15.7 ft (4.8 m)
- Decks: 1
- Installed power: 356 NHP
- Propulsion: triple-expansion steam engine
- Sensors & processing systems: submarine signalling
- Notes: sister ship: City of Bradford

SS City of Leeds was a British North Sea passenger and cargo steamship that was built in Yorkshire in 1903 and scrapped in Northumberland 1937. In the First World War the Imperial German Navy captured her and used her as a depot ship.

== Building ==
In 1903 Earle's Shipbuilding and Engineering of Hull, Yorkshire built a pair of ferries for the Great Central Railway. The Lady Mayoress of Leeds launched City of Leeds on 8 June 1903. City of Leeds' sister ship City of Bradford was launched on 23 July.

City of Leeds' registered length was 256.5 ft (78.2 m), her beam was 34.5 ft (10.5 m) and her depth was 15.7 ft (4.8 m). As built, her tonnages were 1,341 GRT and 733 NRT. She was registered at Grimsby. Her UK official number was 113248 and her code letters were VDWQ.

== Career ==
City of Leeds and City of Bradford ran scheduled services between Grimsby and Hamburg. In 1913 City of Leeds's tonnages were revised to 1,349 GRT and 739 NRT.

When the First World War began at the end of July 1914, City of Leeds was caught unawares, arrived in Hamburg as scheduled and was captured as a prize. Her captain and crew were interned, and the German navy had her converted into a mine depot ship.

After the Armistice of 11 November 1918 her crew was repatriated and City of Leeds was returned to Grimsby.

In 1923 City of Leeds's tonnages were revised again to 1,361 GRT and 678 NRT. In the same year the Great Central became part of the new London and North Eastern Railway (LNER), and City of Leeds became part of its fleet.

By 1930 City of Leeds was equipped for wireless telegraphy and her navigation equipment included submarine signalling. In 1934 the call sign MFTZ superseded her code letters. From 1935 Associated Humber Lines managed her.

In 1937 the LNER sold City of Leeds for scrap. On 30 April she arrived at Blyth, Northumberland to be broken up by Hughes, Blockow & Co.

== Bibliography ==
- Duckworth, Christian; Langmuir, Graham (1968) [1948]. Railway and other Steamers. Prescot: T Stephenson and Sons. ISBN 978-0901314123.
- Harnack, Edwin P (1930) [1903]. All About Ships & Shipping (3rd ed.). London: Faber and Faber.
