= List of shipwrecks in 1982 =

The list of shipwrecks in 1982 includes ships sunk, foundered, grounded, or otherwise lost during 1982.

table of contents
1982
Jan	Feb	Mar	Apr
May	Jun	Jul	Aug
Sep	Oct	Nov	Dec
Unknown date

== January ==
=== 1 January ===
List of shipwrecks: 1 January 1982
Ship	State	Description
Kelsando II	United States	The pleasure craft sank at Port Wells (60°48′N 148°14′W) on the south-central coast of Alaska.
Ms B Haven	United States	The fishing vessel sank in Prince of Wales Passage (60°05′N 148°05′W) on the south-central coast of Alaska.

=== 5 January ===
List of shipwrecks: 5 January 1982
Ship	State	Description
Akebono Maru No.28	Japan	The 549-ton fishing trawler capsized and sank in the Bering Sea 120 nautical miles (220 km; 140 mi) north of Adak in the Aleutian Islands with the loss of 32 lives. There was one survivor. Only eight bodies were recovered.

=== 12 January ===
List of shipwrecks: 12 January 1982
Ship	State	Description
Cape Fairwell	United States	The 72-foot (21.9 m) fishing vessel ran aground, capsized, and was lost north of Mitrofania Island (55.8761°N 158.8156°W) near Chignik, Alaska. The vessel Aleutian Spirit (United States) rescued her crew of four.

=== 20 January ===
List of shipwrecks: 20 January 1982
Ship	State	Description
Calista Sea	United States	After beginning to take on water near Alaska's Shumagin Islands, the 108-foot (32.9 m) crab-fishing vessel sank while under tow to Kupreanof Harbor (55.7897°N 159.3406°W) on the south coast of the Alaska Peninsula by the vessel Polar Shell (United States). The fishing vessel Patricia Lee (United States) rescued all six people on board.

=== 26 January ===
List of shipwrecks: 26 January 1982
Ship	State	Description
Ekaterini P	Greece	The 963 GRT freighter built was built in 1958 by James Lamont & Company, Greenock, yard no. 393 for Associated Humber Lines, Hull as Darlington. In 1978 she was purchased by Evia Shipping Co, Chalkis, Greece and renamed Ekaterini P. She developed a list after cargo shifted on 20 April 1980, when on passage from Rouen for Lattakia and taken to Brest where she was laid up and subsequently vandalised. She was scuttled by the French Navy off Point Penmarc'h in position 47°19′N 05°26′W on 26 January 1982.

=== 29 January ===
List of shipwrecks: 29 January 1982
Ship	State	Description
Kodiak Kid	United States	The 43-foot (13.1 m) tug sank off Woody Island in Alaska's Kodiak Archipelago. A United States Coast Guard helicopter rescued her crew of two from a life raft.
Raymond A	United States	The 76-foot (23.2 m) crab-fishing vessel was destroyed by fire in the Bering Sea north of Umnak Island in the Aleutian Islands. The fishing vessel Ocean Cape (United States) rescued her entire crew of six.

== February ==
=== 8 February ===
List of shipwrecks: 8 February 1982
Ship	State	Description
Sea Hawk	United States	The 102-foot (31 m) crab-fishing vessel sank in the North Pacific Ocean approximately 50 nautical miles (93 km; 58 mi) southeast of Dutch Harbor, Alaska.

=== 9 February ===
List of shipwrecks: 9 February 1982
Ship	State	Description
Bluesky	Saudi Arabia	The refrigerated coaster was scuttled off Jeddah.

=== 12 February ===
List of shipwrecks: 12 February 1982
Ship	State	Description
Victory	Greece	The tanker broke in two in a storm when 800 nautical miles (1,500 km) southwest of Land's End, Cornwall, United Kingdom. Fifteen of her 32 crew were killed when their lifeboat broke up. The survivors were rescued by the frigates HNLMS Van Speijk and HNLMS Callenburgh (both Royal Netherlands Navy).

=== 15 February ===
List of shipwrecks: 15 February 1982
Ship	State	Description
Ocean Ranger	Canada	The oil platform capsized in the Grand Banks, Newfoundland due to malfunctions in ballast system caused by a rogue wave. All 84 crewmembers were killed.

=== 16 February ===
List of shipwrecks: 16 February 1982
Ship	State	Description
Mekhanik Tarasov	Soviet Union	The cargo ship sank in the Atlantic Ocean. 32 lost their life. Only five crew members were rescued by the Faroese longliner fishing vessel "Sigurfari". Mekhanik Tarasov was struck by the same weather conditions as Ocean Ranger which sank barely 24 hours earlier, approximately 65 miles (105 km) to the west.

=== 18 February ===
List of shipwrecks: 18 February 1982
Ship	State	Description
SAS President Kruger	South African Navy	The President-class frigate collided with the replenishment ship SAS Tafelberg (South African Navy) and sank 80 nautical miles (150 km; 92 mi) south of Cape Town, South Africa. Sixteen crewmembers were killed.

=== 20 February ===
List of shipwrecks: 20 February 1982
Ship	State	Description
Rainer II	United States	The cabin cruiser exploded, burned, and sank in Carroll Inlet (55°17′N 131°30′W) in Southeast Alaska approximately 20 nautical miles (37 km; 23 mi) from Ketchikan, Alaska.

=== 23 February ===
List of shipwrecks: 23 February 1982
Ship	State	Description
St. Bedan	United Kingdom	The Troubles: The collier was boarded and bombed by an IRA team using a hijacked lifeboat in Lough Foyle. All crew members survived. The hull was raised and broken up several months later.

=== 26 February ===
List of shipwrecks: 26 February 1982
Ship	State	Description
Craigantlet	Cyprus	The container ship was wrecked at Killantringan Lighthouse in Portamaggie Bay, Wigtownshire, Scotland.

=== 28 February ===
List of shipwrecks: 28 February 1982
Ship	State	Description
Mar Caspio	Argentina	The T2 tanker collided with barges in the Parana River and was consequently scrapped.

== March ==
=== 4 March ===
List of shipwrecks: 4 March 1982
Ship	State	Description
Vortigern	United Kingdom	The ferry ran aground at Ostend, West Flanders, Belgium. Later refloated, repaired and returned to service.

=== 7 March ===
List of shipwrecks: 7 March 1982
Ship	State	Description
Golden Dolphin	United States	The tanker exploded and sank 750 nautical miles (1,390 km) east of Bermuda with the loss of nine crew. Fourteen survivors were rescued by Norrland (Sweden).

=== 11 March ===
List of shipwrecks: 11 March 1982
Ship	State	Description
Ranga	Spain	The remains of Ranga in 2006. The container ship lost engine power during a storm. She went aground at Dunmore Head, on the Dingle Peninsula, County Kerry, Ireland. All crew members were rescued by breeches buoy and a Royal Air Force helicopter. The ship was a total loss, and the bow and other remains are visible today.

=== 30 March ===
List of shipwrecks: 30 March 1982
Ship	State	Description
Cranford	United States	The retired 191-foot (58.2 m), 1,197-gross register ton ferry — which had served subsequently as a floating restaurant — was scuttled as an artificial reef in the North Atlantic Ocean 3.6 nautical miles (6.7 km; 4.1 mi) off Sea Girt, New Jersey, in 70 feet (21 m) of water at 40°07.447′N 073°56.227′W. Her wreck is nicknamed "The Sandbox."

=== 31 March ===
List of shipwrecks: 31 March 1982
Ship	State	Description
Setareh	Islamic Republic of Iran Navy	Iran–Iraq War: The naval tugboat was sunk by AM-39 Exocet missiles fired from an Iraqi Super Frelon helicopter.

== April ==
=== 9 April ===
List of shipwrecks: 9 April 1982
Ship	State	Description
USS Basilone	United States Navy	The decommissioned Gearing-class destroyer was sunk as a target in the Atlantic Ocean about 80 nautical miles (150 km) east of St. Augustine, Florida.

=== 13 April ===
List of shipwrecks: 13 April 1982
Ship	State	Description
USS Robinson	United States Navy	The decommissioned Fletcher-class destroyer was sunk as a target off Puerto Rico.

=== 18 April ===
List of shipwrecks: 18 April 1982
Ship	State	Description
Sharelga	Ireland	The trawler was sunk when her nets were caught by the British submarine HMS Porpoise (Royal Navy). All five crew survived.

=== 26 April ===
List of shipwrecks: 26 April 1982
Ship	State	Description
ARA Santa Fe	Argentine Navy	Falklands War: The Balao-class submarine sank alongside a pier at King Edward Point on South Georgia Island a day after suffering damage in combat with, and surrendering to, British forces. She later was refloated and scuttled in February 1985.

== May ==
=== 2 May ===
List of shipwrecks: 2 May 1982
Ship	State	Description
ARA General Belgrano	Argentine Navy	Falklands War: The Brooklyn-class light cruiser was torpedoed and sunk off the Isla de los Estados, Argentina by the submarine HMS Conqueror (Royal Navy) with the loss of 323 of her 1,093 crew.

=== 4 May ===
List of shipwrecks: 4 May 1982
Ship	State	Description
HMS Sheffield	Royal Navy	Falklands War: The Type 42 destroyer was struck by one Exocet missile fired by an Argentine Navy Dassault-Breguet Super Étendard aircraft and sank off the Falkland Islands. Twenty crew killed. The ship was taken in tow by HMS Yarmouth (Royal Navy) but sank on 10 May.

=== 8 May ===
List of shipwrecks: 8 May 1982
Ship	State	Description
USNS Chauvenet	United States Navy	The survey vessel ran aground on Dauisan Reef in the Sulu Sea. She was refloated two weeks later.

=== 10 May ===
List of shipwrecks: 10 May 1982
Ship	State	Description
FV Narwal	Argentine Navy	Falklands War: The spy trawler was damaged by bombs and cannon fire from Fleet Air Arm British Aerospace Sea Harrier aircraft from HMS Hermes (Royal Navy) on 9 May and was captured by a Special Boat Squadron team. She sank while under tow the next day.

=== 11 May ===
List of shipwrecks: 11 May 1982
Ship	State	Description
ARA Isla de los Estados	Argentine Navy	Falklands War: The bulk carrier was sunk off the Falkland Islands by shelling from HMS Alacrity (Royal Navy). There were only two survivors from her crew of 22.

=== 13 May ===
List of shipwrecks: 13 May 1982
Ship	State	Description
Humdinger	United States	The 36-foot (11.0 m) fishing vessel sank in the Gulf of Alaska approximately 15 nautical miles (28 km; 17 mi) east of Shuyak Island in Alaska's Kodiak Archipelago. The vessel Fairweather (United States) rescued her crew of three.
Sentinel	United States	The fishing vessel sank 6 nautical miles (11 km; 6.9 mi) south of Danger Island (59°55′30″N 148°05′00″W) off the south-central coast of Alaska. A private air service rescued both of her crewmen.

=== 16 May ===
List of shipwrecks: 16 May 1982
Ship	State	Description
ARA Bahía Buen Suceso	Argentine Navy	Falklands War: The fleet supply ship was strafed by British Aerospace Sea Harrier aircraft from HMS Hermes (Royal Navy) whilst moored at Fox Bay East, West Falkland and set on fire. The fire was extinguished by her crew, but the ship ran aground during a gale some days later.

=== 21 May ===
List of shipwrecks: 21 May 1982
Ship	State	Description
B J	United States	The fishing vessel capsized in bad weather near Hinchinbrook Island, 25 nautical miles (46 km) southwest of Cordova, Alaska. The only person aboard was rescued.

=== 22 May ===
List of shipwrecks: 22 May 1982
Ship	State	Description
HMS Ardent	Royal Navy	Falklands War: The Type 21 frigate sank as a result of damage sustained in an attack by Douglas A-4 Skyhawk aircraft of the Argentine Navy the previous day. The fighters were part of the air group based aboard the aircraft carrier ARA Veinticinco de Mayo (Argentine Navy), but this mission was carried out from a land base at Rio Grande. Twenty-two of her crew were killed.
Camelot	United States	The 34-foot (10.4 m) fishing vessel capsized and drifted aground in bad weather with the loss of one life near Hinchinbrook Island on the south-central coast of Alaska 25 nautical miles (46 km; 29 mi) southwest of Cordova, Alaska.
ARA Monsunen	Argentine Navy	Falklands War: Battle of Seal Cove: The armed supply vessel repelled the assault of a Westland Lynx helicopter from HMS Brilliant (Royal Navy) with machine gun fire; she was run aground at Seal Cove, west of Lively Island, to deceive the British radar and avoid capture, while being shelled by HMS Yarmouth (Royal Navy) . The coastal ship was initially abandoned. The crew re-embarked the next morning after the tide refloated the vessel and completed her mission assisted by the armed coaster ARA Forrest (Argentine Navy).

=== 24 May ===
List of shipwrecks: 24 May 1982
Ship	State	Description
HMS Antelope	Royal Navy	HMS Antelope Falklands War: The Type 21 frigate was bombed and sunk in Grantham Sound, Falkland Islands, by an Argentine Air Force Douglas A-4 Skyhawk aircraft. One crewmember and a British Army technician who was trying to defuse an unexploded bomb were killed when the bomb exploded. Over 100 survivors were rescued by the landing craft utility HMS F4 (Royal Navy).

=== 25 May ===
List of shipwrecks: 25 May 1982
Ship	State	Description
Atlantic Conveyor	United Kingdom	Falklands War: The container ship was struck by two Exocet missiles fired by Argentine Navy Super Étendard aircraft. The ship was set on fire, and abandoned. Twelve of her crew were killed. 24 survivors were rescued by HMS Brilliant (Royal Navy). The container ship eventually sank at 50°40′S 54°28′W on 30 May.
HMS Coventry	Royal Navy	Falklands War: The Type 42 destroyer was bombed and sunk north of the Falkland Sound, Falkland Islands by Douglas A-4 Skyhawk aircraft of the Argentine Air Force. Nineteen crew were killed.
Westpro	United States	The 189-foot (58 m) fish-processing vessel caught fire while moored at a pier in Seward, Alaska. After toxic fumes from the fire drifted into Seward and forced the evacuation of 1,000 people, Westpro was towed out into the Gulf of Alaska, where she sank.

== June ==
=== 4 June ===
List of shipwrecks: 4 June 1982
Ship	State	Description
Diane Lynn	United States	The 29-foot (8.8 m) vessel sank off Hanin Rocks (57°50′05″N 152°18′45″W) near Kodiak, Alaska. All four people aboard survived.

=== 6 June ===
List of shipwrecks: 6 June 1982
Ship	State	Description
Algosea	West Germany	The self-unloading bulk carrier collided with a pier at Port Weller, Ontario, Canada. The ship's bow was significantly damaged, necessitating its replacement. The vessel returned to service in August, renamed Sauniere.

=== 8 June ===
List of shipwrecks: 8 June 1982
Ship	State	Description
RFA Sir Galahad	Royal Navy	Falklands War: Bluff Cove air attacks: The Round Table-class landing ship logistics was wrecked and set on fire by bombs dropped by Douglas A-4 Skyhawk aircraft of the Argentine Air Force at Port Pleasant, Falkland Islands. Forty-eight sailors and soldiers were killed.
HMS F4	Royal Navy	Falklands War: Bluff Cove air attacks: The Mk.9-class landing craft utility was bombed and sunk near the mouth of Choiseul Sound 4 miles (6.4 km) south east of Bertha's Beach, East Falkland Island by Douglas A-4 Skyhawk aircraft of the Argentine Air Force. Six crew, four Royal Marines and two sailors, were killed, two others survived.

=== 9 June ===
List of shipwrecks: 9 June 1982
Ship	State	Description
Lloyd	United States	The 60-foot (18.3 m) halibut-fishing vessel sank approximately 25 nautical miles (46 km; 29 mi) south of Seward, Alaska. The fishing vessel Gjoa and Marathon (both United States) rescued her crew of five.

=== 11 June ===
List of shipwrecks: 11 June 1982
Ship	State	Description
Mercury	Singapore	The ore carrier caught fire off Crete, Greece. She was on a voyage from Varna, Romania to Manila, Philippines. Mercury was declared a constructive total loss and scrapped.

=== 16 June ===
List of shipwrecks: 4 June 1982
Ship	State	Description
Transit	Lebanon	1982 Lebanon War: The coaster was damaged the Mediterranean Sea 8 nautical miles (15 km) off Tripoli, Lebanon. The cause was a torpedo attack by an unnamed Israeli submarine (Israeli Navy). She was carrying 56 refugees to Larnaca, Cyprus, 25 of whom were killed. The ship was beached but later sank.

=== 19 June ===
List of shipwrecks: 19 June 1982
Ship	State	Description
Sao Tome	Unidentified	The 40-foot (12.2 m) steel-hulled sailing yacht was blown ashore at Hatteras Inlet on the Outer Banks on the coast of North Carolina during a subtropical storm. The United States Coast Guard refloated her on 20 June by towing her off the beach.

=== 21 June ===
List of shipwrecks: 21 June 1982
Ship	State	Description
RFA Sir Galahad	Royal Navy	Falklands War: The wreck of the Round Table-class landing ship logistics was towed out to sea and sunk in the South Atlantic Ocean by the submarine HMS Onyx (Royal Navy) at 51°50′S 58°12′W.

=== 27 June ===
List of shipwrecks: 27 June 1982
Ship	State	Description
Donny Boy	United States	The fish tender was wrecked off Castle Cape (56°10′N 158°20′W) near Chignik, Alaska.
Pafco 20	United States	The 32-foot (9.8 m) fishing vessel sank near Whale Pass (57°56′N 152°50′W) in the Kodiak Archipelago between Kodiak Island and Whale Island. The vessel New Morning (United States) rescued both people who had been aboard.

=== 28 June ===
List of shipwrecks: 28 June 1982
Ship	State	Description
Sea Wife	United States	The fishing vessel sank in the Gulf of Alaska approximately 50 nautical miles (93 km; 58 mi) southwest of Homer, Alaska. The fishing vessel Lobo del Mar (United States) rescued both members of her crew.

== July ==
=== 3 July ===
List of shipwrecks: 3 July 1982
Ship	State	Description
Miserable Skunk	United States	The 19-foot (5.8 m) cabin cruiser capsized with the loss of two lives in Kachemak Bay in Cook Inlet, 5 nautical miles (9.3 km; 5.8 mi) west of Homer, Alaska.

=== 14 July ===
List of shipwrecks: 14 July 1982
Ship	State	Description
HDMS Herluf Trolle	Royal Danish Navy	The Peder Skram-class frigate was severely damaged by an engine room fire. Subsequently repaired and returned to service.

=== 18 July ===
List of shipwrecks: 18 July 1982
Ship	State	Description
USS Agerholm	United States Navy	USS Agerholm being sunk. The decommissioned Gearing-class destroyer was sunk as a target by a UGM-109 Tomahawk missile fired by the submarine USS Guitarro (United States Navy) in the Pacific Ocean at approximately 32°45′N 119°32′W.
USS Porterfield	United States Navy	The decommissioned Fletcher-class destroyer was sunk as a target.

=== 23 July ===
List of shipwrecks: 23 July 1982
Ship	State	Description
Pacific Trawler	United States	The 130-foot (39.6 m) fishing vessel burned and sank near Latouche Island in Prince William Sound on the south-central coast of Alaska.

=== 31 July ===
List of shipwrecks: 31 July 1982
Ship	State	Description
Cornell No. 10	United States	The 130-foot (39.6 m) barge ran aground and sank in Kuskokwim Bay on the southwest coast of Alaska approximately 22 nautical miles (41 km; 25 mi) west of Carter Spit (59°19′N 162°00′W).

== August ==
=== 2 August ===
List of shipwrecks: 2 August 1982
Ship	State	Description
Pacific Rose	United States	The fishing vessel capsized and sank in the Bering Sea approximately 65 nautical miles (120 km; 75 mi) northwest of Saint Paul Island.

=== 9 August ===
List of shipwrecks: 9 August 1982
Ship	State	Description
Hasrat Mulia	Indonesia	The ferry sank in the Strait of Macassar. Only 135 survivors were reported of the 400 people on board.
Litison Bride	Greece	Iran–Iraq War: The cargo ship was sunk in the Persian Gulf by a rocket fired by an Iranian Navy warship. All 26 crew survived.
Sambow Banner	South Korea	Iran–Iraq War: The cargo ship was shelled and sunk in the Persian Gulf by an Iranian Navy ship.

=== 16 August ===
List of shipwrecks: 16 August 1982
Ship	State	Description
Tina Rae	United States	The 30-foot (9.1 m) vessel sank in the Gulf of Alaska off Spruce Cape (57°49′15″N 152°20′00″W) near Kodiak, Alaska.

=== 30 August ===
List of shipwrecks: 30 August 1982
Ship	State	Description
Jeffron	United States	The fish processing vessel was destroyed by fire in Captains Bay (53°52′N 166°34′W) in Unalaska Bay on the coast of Unalaska Island in the Aleutian Islands.

== September ==
=== 7 September ===
List of shipwrecks: 7 September 1982
Ship	State	Description
Investor	United States	After her eight passengers and crew were shot to death while she was at anchor off Egg Island (55°28′30″N 131°09′00″W) near Craig, Alaska, the 58-foot (17.7 m) seiner was destroyed by a fire. A lone, unidentified man was seen leaving the vessel in a skiff as she burned, and authorities suspected him of having committed the murders and of having set her on fire.

=== 10 September ===
List of shipwrecks: 10 September 1982
Ship	State	Description
Milanian	Islamic Republic of Iran Navy	Iran–Iraq War: The Bayandor-class frigate was sunk by AM-39 Exocet missiles from an Iraqi Super Frelon helicopter.

=== 11 September ===
List of shipwrecks: 11 September 1982
Ship	State	Description
Alaskan Warrior	United States	The 52-foot (15.8 m) fishing vessel sank off Dangerous Cape (57°17′N 152°42′W) near Kodiak, Alaska. The vessels Miss Brenda and Abby Jo (both United States) rescued all five people on board.

=== 16 September ===
List of shipwrecks: 16 September 1982
Ship	State	Description
Barbie Island	United States	When the 42-foot (12.8 m) gillnet fishing vessel attempted to depart Sudden Stream (59°47′00″N 139°58′30″W) on the coast of Yakutat Bay on the south-central coast of Alaska, 25 miles (40 km) from Yakutat and 8 nautical miles (15 km; 9.2 mi) southwest of Blizhni Point, large waves struck her, first breaking the windows in her wheelhouse, then washing the wheelhouse overboard and sinking her, killing two members of her crew. Her two survivors clung to a floating hatch cover for two days before reaching shore near Point Manby, where they were rescued.

=== 18 September ===
List of shipwrecks: 18 September 1982
Ship	State	Description
Armorique	France	The ferry ran aground off Saint-Malo, Ille-et-Vilaine. She was later refloated, repaired and returned to service.
Lady Ann	Australia	The offshore supply vessel collided with Regional Endeavour (Australia) off the Exmouth Gulf, Western Australia. She subsequently sank. All six crew were rescued by Lady Sally (Australia).

=== 30 September ===
List of shipwrecks: 30 September 1982
Ship	State	Description
Kaiyo Maru No. 12	Japan	The fish processing ship burned and sank 15 nautical miles (28 km; 17 mi) north of Dutch Harbor, Alaska. Her crew of 27 survived.

== October ==
=== 12 October ===
List of shipwrecks: 12 October 1982
Ship	State	Description
Elhawi Star	Saudi Arabia	The cargo ship sank in calm seas off Rijeka Yugoslavia. All 30 crew survived.

=== 16 October ===
List of shipwrecks: 16 October 1982
Ship	State	Description
Island Cement	Bahamas	The wreck of Island Cement the day after she was scuttled. The bulk cement carrier was scuttled in the Bahamas approximately 1.5 nautical miles (2.8 km) off Williamstown, Grand Bahama Island, to serve as a recreational dive site.

=== 19 October ===
List of shipwrecks: 19 October 1982
Ship	State	Description
"Eastards"	United Kingdom	The 52.7-foot (16.1 m) fishing vessel was stranded at Thyboron, Denmark, Crew rescued.

=== 21 October ===
List of shipwrecks: 21 October 1982
Ship	State	Description
ARA Bahía Buen Suceso	Argentine Navy	Falklands War: The abandoned fleet replenishment ship was towed out to deep water in the South Atlantic Ocean off the Falkland Islands and sunk by British Aerospace Sea Harrier aircraft of 809 Naval Air Squadron, Fleet Air Arm and a torpedo fired by submarine HMS Onyx (Royal Navy).

=== 24 October ===
List of shipwrecks: 24 October 1982
Ship	State	Description
Trashman	United States	The 17.9 metres (59 ft) long ketch lost her rig and eventually sank during a gale off Cape Hatteras. Two survivors on a dinghy were rescued four days later by Olenegorsk (Soviet Union), among them businesswoman Deborah Scaling Kiley, who later wrote a chronicle of the ordeal. Three crewmembers lost at sea.

=== 25 October ===
List of shipwrecks: 25 October 1982
Ship	State	Description
USS Savage	United States Navy	The decommissioned Edsall-class destroyer escort was sunk as a target in the Pacific Ocean off California.

== November ==
=== 12 November ===
List of shipwrecks: 12 November 1982
Ship	State	Description
Quebecois	Canada	The lake freighter ran aground in the St. Lawrence River off Van Rensselaer Point. The ship remained aground until freed the next day without major damage.

=== 14 November ===
List of shipwrecks: 14 November 1982
Ship	State	Description
Nesam	United Kingdom	The cargo ship capsized and sank in bad weather 85 nautical miles (157 km) off the Isles of Scilly with the loss of five of her eleven crew. The survivors were rescued by a RAF Sea King helicopter of 202 Squadron.

=== 21 November ===
List of shipwrecks: 21 November 1982
Ship	State	Description
Raffaello	Islamic Republic of Iran Navy	Iran–Iraq War: The barracks ship, a former ocean liner, was hit by AM-39 Exocet missiles from an Iraqi Super Frelon helicopter or missile boats. The ship burned and was later scuttled.

== December ==
=== 7 December ===
List of shipwrecks: 7 December 1982
Ship	State	Description
Miss Brenda	United States	The 38-foot (11.6 m) fishing vessel sank in Duck Bay (58°06′N 152°28′W) on the coast of Afognak Island in Alaska's Kodiak Archipelago. The fishing vessel Ruff & Reddy (United States) rescued all eight people who had been aboard.

=== 12 December ===
List of shipwrecks: 12 December 1982
Ship	State	Description
Eastern Sea	United States	The 82-foot (25.0 m) fishing vessel sank in the Gulf of Alaska approximately 13 nautical miles (24 km; 15 mi) off Cape Chiniak (57°37′N 152°10′W) on Kodiak Island in Alaska's Kodiak Archipelago. The fishing vessel Mar Del Norte (United States) rescued her entire crew of four.

=== 19 December ===
List of shipwrecks: 19 December 1982
Ship	State	Description
European Gateway	United Kingdom	The ferry collided with Speedlink Vanguard (United Kingdom) off Harwich, Essex and capsized, killing six people. Sixty-five people were saved by Dana Futura (Denmark). The ship was salvaged, repaired and returned to service.

=== 27 December ===
List of shipwrecks: 27 December 1982
Ship	State	Description
Sea King I	United States	The 82-foot (25 m) tug sank in Aurora Basin (58°18′15″N 134°24′30″W) at Juneau, Alaska.

=== 31 December ===
List of shipwrecks: 31 December 1982
Ship	State	Description
Johanna	Netherlands	Johanna. The coaster ran aground at Hartland Point, Devon, United Kingdom. The ship was declared to be abandoned and was stripped by local inhabitants.

=== Unknown date ===
List of shipwrecks: Unknown date December 1982
Ship	State	Description
Neg Chieftain	United Kingdom	The tug capsized and sank off Ramsgate, Kent. She was subsequently raised.
Unirea	Romania	The oil tanker suffered an explosion, broke up, and sank in the Black Sea 40 nautical miles (46 mi; 74 km) south-southeast of Cape Kaliakra, Bulgaria, with the loss of one life.

== Unknown date ==
List of shipwrecks: Unknown date 1982
Ship	State	Description
Eastern Sea	United States	The 82-foot (25.0 m) fishing vessel ran aground near Togiak, Alaska, sometime during 1982 prior to mid-December and at the end of herring season in that area. She was refloated and returned to service.
Jaram	Singapore	The TID-class tug sank in the Bamu River.
Mahi	United States	The research ship was sunk in the Pacific Ocean off Waianae, Hawaii, to serve as a recreational dive site.
Temehani	France	The cargo liner sank in the Pacific Ocean near Bora Bora in the Society Islands in French Polynesia.

== See also ==
- Lists of shipwrecks
