= SS Douglas =

SS Douglas may refer to the following four ships:

- SS Douglas (1858): a paddle-steamer of the Isle of Man Steam Packet Company which subsequently became a blockade runner for the Confederate Navy during the American Civil War under the name Margaret & Jessie, before being taken as "prize" and serving in the Union Navy as the USS Gettysburg.
- SS Douglas (1864): the second steamer in the fleet of the Isle of Man Steam Packet Company to bear the name.
- SS Douglas (1889): originally a packet steamer of the London and Southwestern Railway named Dora. Acquired by the Isle of Man Steam Packet Company in 1901 and re-named Douglas.
- SS Douglas (1907): a freight vessel built for the Clyde Shipbuilding and Engineering in Port Glasgow for Goole Steam Shipping Company.
