= SS Accrington (1910) =

Passenger and cargo vessel

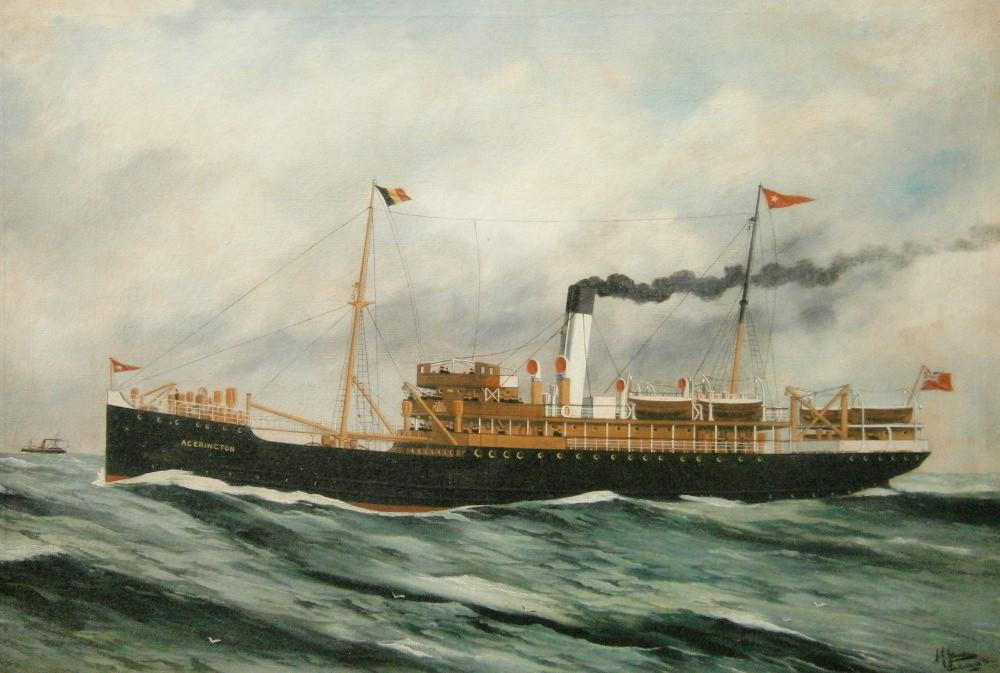
- Accrington, by A. J. Jansen, Antwerp 1910

History
- Name: SS Accrington
- Operator: 1910–1923: Great Central Railway; 1923–1935: London and North Eastern Railway; 1935–1958: Associated Humber Lines
- Port of registry: (United Kingdom)
- Builder: Earle's Shipbuilding, Hull
- Launched: 7 June 1910
- Fate: Scrapped 3 May 1951

General characteristics
- Tonnage: 1,629 gross register tons (GRT)
- Length: 265 feet (81 m)
- Beam: 36 feet (11 m)
- Depth: 17.4 feet (5.3 m)
- Installed power: Two cylindrical boilers, working pressure of 280 pounds/sq inch.
- Propulsion: Triple expansion surface condensing engines with cylinders of 22 inches (56 cm), 35 inches (89 cm), 60 inches (150 cm) with 42 inches (110 cm) stroke.

SS Accrington was a passenger and cargo vessel built for the Great Central Railway in 1910.

== History ==
The ship was built by Earle's Shipbuilding of Hull and launched on 7 June 1910 by Miss C. Fay, daughter of Sir Sam Fay, general manager of the Great Central Railway She was one of an order for four ships, the others being Dewsbury, Blackburn and Bury.

Accrington was a steel, one deck type with poop, long bridge and topgallant forecastle with accommodation for first, second and third class passengers intended for passenger and cargo service between Grimsby and Hamburg. The construction was to Lloyd's 100 A1 class and also Board of Trade rules, German Emigration Laws and Hamburg Harbor Authorities requirements. Steam heating and electric lighting as well as ventilation for passenger spaces was installed. She was built with accommodation for 100 first-class passengers, and 300 third-class passengers.

On 15 June 1922 a wealthy Australian passenger arriving into Grimsby on the Accrington was arrested by customs officials following the discovery of 100 bottles of cocaine, concealed in the false bottom of his trunk, and he also had £100 in notes in his possession.

In 1923 she was acquired by the London and North Eastern Railway and in 1935 by Associated Humber Lines. On 16 December 1937 she was in collision in the River Elbe with the German steamer Falkenfels. She received considerable damage and was delayed for 24 hours.
