= SS Mersey =

History

United Kingdom
- Name: 1906–1940: SS Mersey
- Operator: 1906–1922: Lancashire and Yorkshire Railway; 1922–1923: London and North Western Railway; 1923–1935: London, Midland and Scottish Railway; 1935–1940: Associated Humber Lines, Goole
- Port of registry: (United Kingdom)
- Builder: Swan Hunter and Wigham Richardson
- Yard number: 752
- Launched: 23 February 1906
- Completed: April 1906
- Fate: Sunk by a mine 20 April 1940 near Midrake Buoy. 51°17′N 01°28′E

General characteristics
- Tonnage: 1,087 gross register tons (GRT)
- Length: 255 feet (78 m)
- Beam: 36 feet (11 m)
- Draught: 16.3 feet (5.0 m)

SS Mersey was a freight vessel built for the Lancashire and Yorkshire Railway in 1906.

== History ==
She was built in 1906 by Swan Hunter and Wigham Richardson as a sister ship to SS Irwell, and launched on 23 February 1906 for the Lancashire and Yorkshire Railway to provide freight services from Goole to Rotterdam.

In 1915 she was switched to the Great Western Railway's Weymouth to the Channel Isles service. In 1917 she was converted with to a cable layer in 1917. In 1920 she was released back to her owners.

She transferred to the London and North Western Railway in 1922, the London, Midland and Scottish Railway in 1923 and Associated Humber Lines in 1935.

She was sunk after being mined on 20 April 1940. Nine men were rescued, two of whom since died. Eleven men were reported missing People from the shore saw a great column of water thrown into the air, and the vessel sank in three minutes.
