= Hull and Netherlands Steamship Company =

The Hull & Netherlands Steamship Co. Ltd. was formed in 1894 and brought together the shipping operations of CL Ringrose and WHH Hutchinson with the intention of concentrating their shipping services to that specific area of operation.

== History ==
=== Overview ===
In the early 20th century the company encountered strong competition from other local companies serving the Humber ports and one of their main competitors Thomas Wilson Sons and Co. had set up a new joint venture in March 1906 with the North Eastern Railway Company called Wilson's & North Eastern Railway Shipping Co. Ltd rationalising their two operations and further strengthening the competition.

Hull & Netherlands launched new and upgraded vessels into their service in 1907 which provoked interest from the North Eastern Railway and in 1908 the company was taken over by the railway company and subsequently operated as a subsidiary within their group operations. In 1923 the North Eastern Railway and its subsidiaries were absorbed into the LNER as part of the rationalisation of the rail industry in the UK

In 1935 it was agreed that the shipping services and port operations of the respective railway companies operating from and in the Humber ports should be merged and the company was taken under the operating umbrella of Associated Humber Lines. It was the smallest of the four operations merged at that time and contributed just two ships to the new 30 ship joint operation.

=== Key dates ===
- 1845 - The St. George Steam Packet Company of Liverpool commenced serving Antwerp and various Baltic Sea ports terminating at Saint Petersburg from Hull.
- 1848 - The Hull Steam Packet Company was formed out of the earlier company.
- 1894 - The Hull & Netherlands Steamship Co. Ltd. was formed by C.L. Ringrose and W.H.H. Hutchinson by merging the interests of the Hull Steam Packet Company and those of Hutchinson. The intention being to trade exclusively between Hull and the Netherlands.
- 1907 - A major rebuilding plan was initiated with the building of four Abbey ships which had much greater and superior capacity.
- 1908 - The North Eastern Railway (NER) took over the company, which then operated as a subsidiary of NER. Their interest having been intensified by the 1907 fleet developments.
- 1923 - The NER. became part of the London & North Eastern Railway.
- 1935 - Associated Humber Lines was formed to rationalise the railway companies shipping services and port activity in the Humber.

== Routes ==
Hull to Netherlands.

== Livery ==
Funnel : Buff with black top. Hull : Black with red boot topping. Brown uppers and masts.

== Passenger / cargo vessels operated ==
Ship	Launched	Tonnage (GRT)	Notes and references
SS Swift	1884	671	Built by Sunderland Shipbuilding Company for Hutchinson and entered service between Hull and Rotterdam. Sold in early 1902 to General Steam Navigation Co. and traded out of London until 1911 when she was sold to the Bank of Athens and renamed Osmanie for trading under the management of A. Gaetano and Co. who later purchased the vessel. After 39 years she was broken up in 1933.
SS Sea Gull	1892	817	Built by Murdoch & Murray in Port Glasgow for the Hull Steam Packet Co. which was managed by W & CL Ringrose. Transferred to Hull & Netherlands Steamship in 1894 and served until 1911 when sold to Hilal S.N.Co. of Constantinople and renamed Millet. She was shelled and sunk by Russian Derzky-class destroyers Derzky and Bespokoiny on 5 May 1915 off Eregli, Turkey.
SS Swallow	1899	1,004	Built by Earle's Shipbuilding for the company's Rotterdam service. Sold in 1910 to Sicilian interests and renamed Roma. Changed hands within Italy being renamed Tobruk before being scrapped in 1934.
SS Swan	1899	1,106	Sister of Swallow also built at Earle's. Served on Rotterdam route until 1910 when replaced by the newbuildings. Sold that year to Stoomvaart Maatshappij Friesland of Amsterdam and renamed Minister Tak van Poorvliet. Torpedoed by submarine UB-10 and sank 20 miles north of IJmuiden while in passage from Hull to Harlingen on 24 April 1917.
SS Swift / SS Selby Abbey	1899	1,004	Sister of Swan. Renamed Selby Abbey in 1908 reflecting the change of ownership of the company and to blend with the new naming policy adopted for the four 'Abbey' vessels being built. Sold in 1913 to Gerhard & Hay of Windau, Riga and renamed Triton. Sunk as a block ship in August 1914 at Windau she was raised and rebuilt by Kaiser Werft in Danzig in 1916 for supply work with the same name. Renamed Triton l in 1923 and Falke in 1927 when resold within Germany. In 1929 she carried General Delgado to La Guaira in Venezuela for an abortive revolution, the General being killed. Became Ilse Vormauer in 1930 and traded in the Caribbean and Yunque in 1933 when sold to Cuban interests. Finally renamed Colombia (or Columbia) as a Cuban naval transport. Stranded and lost in a hurricane at Havana, Cuba on 18 October 1944.
SS Whitby Abbey	1907	1,188	Built by Wm.Grey and Co. at West Hartlepool for the Rotterdam service. Taken over in 1914 as an Armed Boarding Steamer spending part of her duty in the Mediterranean. Returned to her owners in 1920. She was transferred to A.H.L in 1935 but was considered redundant on account of her age. She was broken up in 1936.
SS Rievaulx Abbey	1907	1,166	Sister of Whitby Abbey, except built at Earle's Shipbuilding. In the later stages of 1914, Officers of the NER's pals battalion, the 17th Battalion Northumberland Fusiliers, were accommodated aboard the ship whilst in dock at Hull. She was taken over by the Admiralty in March 1915 as a stores carrier and later that year converted to an ammunition carrier. On voyage Rotterdam for Hull, sank on 3 September 1916 after hitting a mine laid by submarine UC-10 one mile off Rosse Spit Buoy in the Humber estuary, with the loss of two lives.
SS Kirkham Abbey	1907	1,166	Sister of Whitby Abbey, except built at Earle's Shipbuilding. Remained in company service during World War I and escaped two earlier attacks before being sunk on 27 July 1918 by a torpedo from submarine UB-40 two miles off Winterton-on-Sea, while in passage from Rotterdam to Hull, with eight lives lost.
SS Jervaulx Abbey	1907	1,188	Built by William Gray & Company, of West Hartlepool. One of 4 sisters which together operated a daily service to Rotterdam. Continued commercial service in 1914, but the blockade of Holland caused vessel to be deployed as an armed boarding steamer. Returned to her owners in 1920 and transferred to LNER in 1923. Transferred into service with A.H.L. in 1935, but was sold in 1936 to Chinese interests and renamed Houlee. Sunk by Japanese forces action in 1938.
SS Melrose Abbey	1929	1,908	Built by Earle's Shipbuilding of Hull for Hull-Rotterdam service. The final ship to be built for the company and quite different from their traditional profile. One of the two ships transferred into service with A.H.L. in 1935. Following the fall of the Netherlands, she operated in coastal convoys until conversion to a convoy rescue ship in 1941, but a grounding while on delivery voyage, including being struck by a mine while stranded, caused severe damage which, but for the war, would have been terminal. Was re-floated and repaired at Aberdeen and finally took up service in February 1942. Resumed Hull-Rotterdam service in March 1946. Renamed Melrose Abbey II in April 1958 to release name for a new building. Withdrawn and laid up in January 1959. Sold to Greek cruising and ferry company Typaldos Lines and renamed Kriti. Served until liquidation of owners in 1966, then laid up in the port of Piraeus where she was broken up in 1984.

== Bibliography ==
- Haws, Duncan (1993), "Britain's Railway Steamers North Western and Eastern Companies + Zeeland and Stena", Merchant Fleets, TCL Publications, Hereford, ISBN 0-946378-22-3
- Greenway, Ambrose (1986), A Century of North Sea Passenger Steamers, Ian Allan, Shepperton, ISBN 0-7110-1338-1
