= SS Macclesfield =

History
- Name: SS Macclesfield
- Operator: 1914–1923: Great Central Railway; 1923–1935: London and North Eastern Railway; 1935–1948: Associated Humber Lines; 1948–1958: British Railways
- Port of registry: (United Kingdom)
- Builder: Swan Hunter
- Yard number: 936
- Launched: 22 May 1914
- Out of service: 1958
- Fate: Scrapped 1958

General characteristics
- Tonnage: 1,018 gross register tons (GRT)
- Length: 250 feet (76 m)
- Beam: 34.2 feet (10.4 m)
- Depth: 16 feet (4.9 m)

SS Macclesfield was a cargo vessel built for the Great Central Railway in 1914.

== History ==
The ship was built by Swan Hunter and launched on 22 May 1914 by Miss Fay, daughter of Sir Sam Fay, general manager of the Great Central Railway. She was the second of an order of two ships from Swan Hunter, the other being Chesterfield. She was deployed on the Grimsby to Rotterdam service.

In 1923 she passed into the ownership of the London and North Eastern Railway and in 1935 to Associated Humber Lines. In 1948 she was in the ownership of British Railways and scrapped in 1958 in Utrecht.
