= SS Chesterfield =

History

United Kingdom
- Name: SS Chesterfield
- Operator: Great Central Railway
- Port of registry: (United Kingdom)
- Builder: Swan, Hunter & Wigham Richardson Ltd, Neptune Yard, Low Walker
- Yard number: 924
- Launched: 30 October 1913
- Out of service: 18 May 1918
- Fate: Torpedoed and sunk

General characteristics
- Tonnage: 1,013 gross register tons (GRT)
- Length: 250 feet (76 m)
- Beam: 34.2 feet (10.4 m)
- Depth: 16 feet (4.9 m)

SS Chesterfield was a cargo vessel built for the Great Central Railway in 1913.

== History ==
The ship was built by Swan Hunter and launched in 1913. She was the first of an order of two ships from Swan Hunter, the other being Macclesfield. She was deployed on the Grimsby to Rotterdam service.

She was requisitioned by the British Admiralty in October 1914 for use as a fleet messenger and renamed HMS Chesterfield. On 18 May 1918 she was torpedoed and sunk in the Mediterranean Sea at 36°17′N 15°13′E, 42 nautical miles (78 km) northeast by east of Malta, by the Imperial German Navy submarine SM UC-52 with the loss of four of her crew.

Map of Sicily. Approximate position of wreck of the Chesterfield
