= SS Hodder =

History
- Name: 1910–1956: SS Hodder
- Operator: 1910–1922: Lancashire and Yorkshire Railway; 1922–1923: London and North Western Railway; 1923–1948: London, Midland and Scottish Railway; 1948–1956: British Railways
- Port of registry: (United Kingdom)
- Builder: William Dobson and Company, Walker Yard
- Yard number: 166
- Launched: 10 January 1910
- Fate: Scrapped 15 November 1956

General characteristics
- Tonnage: 1,016 gross register tons (GRT)
- Length: 240.2 feet (73.2 m)
- Beam: 34.2 feet (10.4 m)
- Draught: 15.4 feet (4.7 m)
- Speed: 13 knots

SS Hodder was a freight vessel built for the Lancashire and Yorkshire Railway in 1910.

== History ==
She was built by William Dobson and Company in Walker Yard for the Lancashire and Yorkshire Railway and launched on 10 January 1910. In an inauspicious start to her career she was in a collision on 2 March 1910 in the River Elbe with the Union and Castle Line ship Avondale Castle.

In 1922 the ship was transferred to the London and North Western Railway and in 1923 to the London, Midland and Scottish Railway.

On 3 February 1925, Joseph Rockett, aged 53, was assisting in moving the steamer in the Goole Docks. He stepped into the spiral of a wire rope, which became taut, and his right foot was torn off, above the ankle and his left leg was fractured.

On 21 December 1936, the Hodder arrived in Goole from Hamburg with four elephants. The elephants were disembarked from the ship, and led to a waiting railway van. Three of the elephants were successfully loaded into the railway van, but the fourth refused. It appeared that the same elephant had had an accident at Goole docks two years previously when it stepped into a railway wagon and part of the floor gave way. Eventually it was tethered to one of the other elephants and persuaded into the van. The train left five hours late.

In 1946 she was transferred to the Holyhead to Dublin route.

She was broken up on 15 November 1956 by Clayton & Davie at Dunston on Tyne.
