= SS Felixstowe =

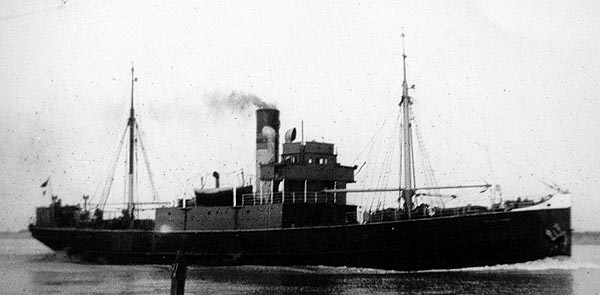

History
- Name: 1918–1950: SS Felixstowe; 1950–1957: SS Kylemore
- Operator: 1918–1923: Great Eastern Railway; 1923–1948: London and North Eastern Railway; 1948–1950: British Railways; 1950–1957: Limerick Steamship Company
- Port of registry: (United Kingdom)
- Builder: Hawthorne and Company, Leith
- Launched: May 1918
- Fate: Scrapped 1957

General characteristics
- Tonnage: 892 gross register tons (GRT)
- Length: 215.1 feet (65.6 m)
- Beam: 33.2 feet (10.1 m)
- Depth: 16 feet (4.9 m)

SS Felixstowe was a cargo vessel built for the Great Eastern Railway in 1918.

== History ==
The ship was built by Hawthorn and Company of Leith and launched in 1918. She was taken over by the London and North Eastern Railway in 1923.

In 1942 she was requisitioned by the Admiralty and converted to a wreck dispersal vessel at Deptford. She increased in tonnage from 892 to 1,200. She was renamed HMS Colchester and put on duty at Sheerness.

She was acquired by British Railways in 1948. In 1950 she was sold to the Limerick Steamship Company and renamed Kylemore.

She was broken up in Rotterdam in 1957.
