= SS Irwell =

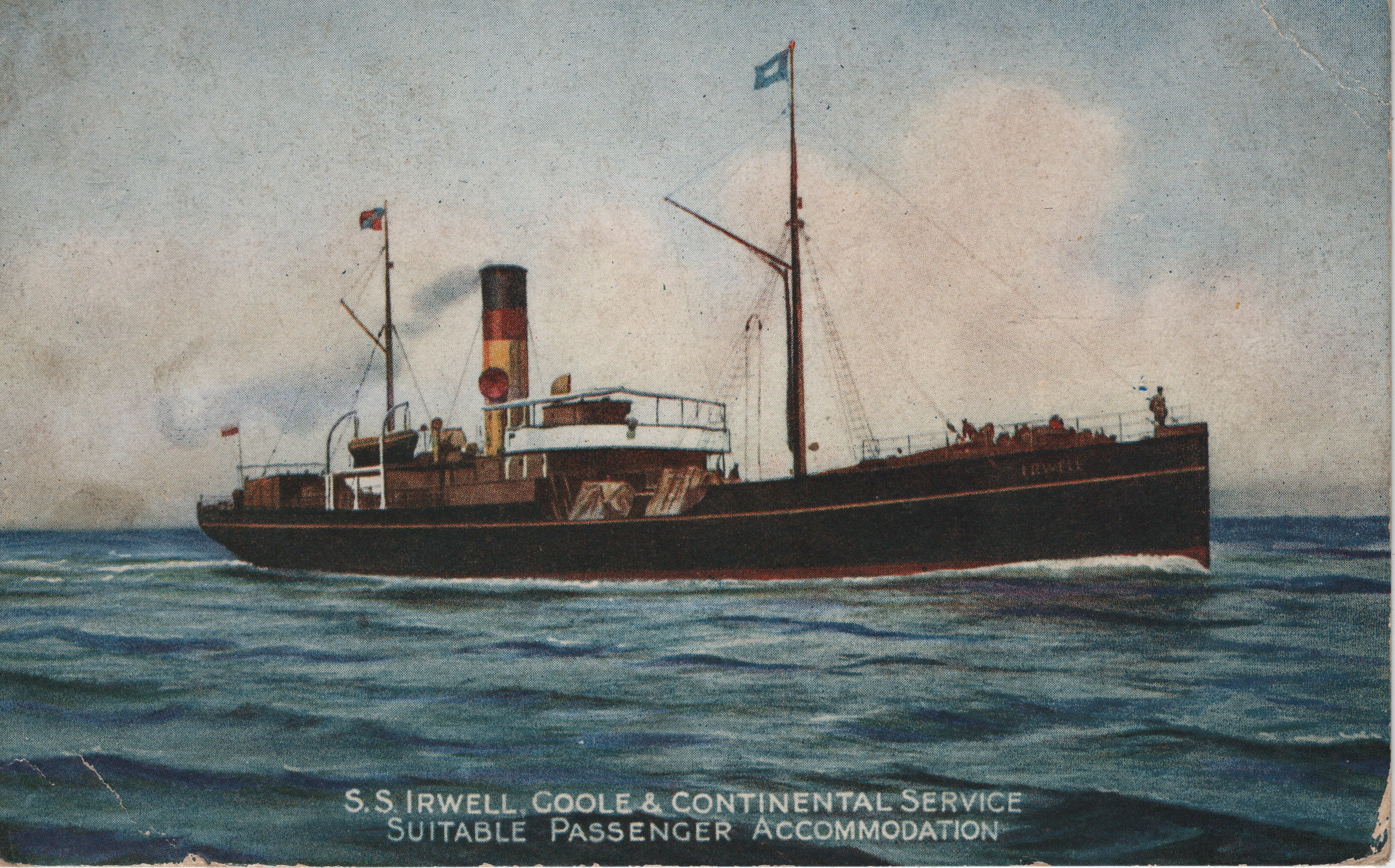
- Postcard depicting the SS Irwell

History

United Kingdom
- Name: 1906–1954: SS Irwell
- Operator: 1906–1922: Lancashire and Yorkshire Railway; 1922–1923: London and North Western Railway; 1923–1935: London, Midland and Scottish Railway; 1935–1948: Associated Humber Lines; 1948–1954: British Transport Commission
- Port of registry: (United Kingdom)
- Builder: Swan Hunter and Wigham Richardson
- Yard number: 758
- Launched: 10 May 1906
- Completed: May 1906
- Out of service: 3 April 1954
- Fate: Scrapped

General characteristics
- Tonnage: 1,040 gross register tons (GRT)
- Length: 255 feet (78 m)
- Beam: 36 feet (11 m)
- Draught: 16.3 feet (5.0 m)

SS Irwell was a freight vessel built for the Lancashire and Yorkshire Railway in 1906.

== History ==
She was built in 1906 by Swan Hunter and Wigham Richardson as a sister ship to SS Mersey, and launched on 10 May 1906 for the Lancashire and Yorkshire Railway to provide freight services from Goole to Rotterdam. She made her maiden voyage from the River Tyne to Goole on 13 June 1906.

In June 1907, two stowaways were discovered when she had departed Hamburg. Clowes Enoch of Schleswig Holstein, and Joseph Todhunter of Birkenhead were found among the sails in the after part between decks

In December 1913, she was returning to Goole from Ghent when she reversed forcefully into the north wall of the dock. A small boat was smashed and some pieces of the wall were dislodged.

In 1914, she was engaged in the potato trade from Jersey, bringing the produce directly into Kingston upon Hull. She was transferred to the London and North Western Railway in 1922 and to the London, Midland and Scottish Railway in 1923.

On 15 May 1929, she left Goole for Copenhagen, but became stuck in ice off the Danish Coast north of Sjaelland with a broken rudder and the steward was reported as dead. The mate of the ship fell overboard, striking his head against one of the anchor chains, and was killed. On 18 October 1934, she collided with the British sloop Edna in the Humber estuary at Whitton, Lincolnshire, England. Edna sank.

She was transferred to Associated Humber Lines in 1935. She was based in Icelandic waters as a naval supply ship during World War II. In 1946, she switched to Larne to Loch Ryan service.

On 28 December 1947, she was on a voyage from Rotterdam in heavy seas; the second officer reported seeing a yacht tossing helplessly flying distress signals. The American vessel, the Seafarer had set out from Cowes to sail to Norway. During the crossing, their engine failed, and the sail was blown away by the westerly gale. They had drifted for two days before being spotted by Irwell. The crew of Irwell managed to get a line aboard Seafarer, and they towed the yacht to Masslius.

In 1948, she was transferred to the British Transport Commission and she was scrapped in March 1954 at Gateshead.
