= SS West Riding (1894) =

History
- Name: SS West Riding
- Operator: 1894–1905: Goole Steam Shipping Company; 1905–1922: Lancashire and Yorkshire Railway; 1922–1923: London and North Western Railway; 1923–1947: London, Midland and Scottish Railway
- Port of registry: (United Kingdom)
- Builder: Joseph Scarr, Grovehill, Beverley
- Launched: September 1894
- Out of service: 1947
- Fate: Scrapped 1947

General characteristics
- Tonnage: 103 gross register tons (GRT)
- Length: 93.2 feet (28.4 m)
- Beam: 16.5 feet (5.0 m)
- Depth: 6.6 feet (2.0 m)

SS West Riding was a freight vessel built for the Goole Steam Shipping Company in 1894.

== History ==
The ship was built by Joseph Scarr, Grovehill, Beverley for the Goole Steam Shipping Company and launched in September 1894 and used as a multi purpose water, coal bunkering vessel and fire float.

In 1905 she was acquired by the Lancashire and Yorkshire Railway.

In 1922 she was acquired by the London and North Western Railway and one year later by the London, Midland and Scottish Railway.

She was scrapped in 1947.
