= SS Dearne =

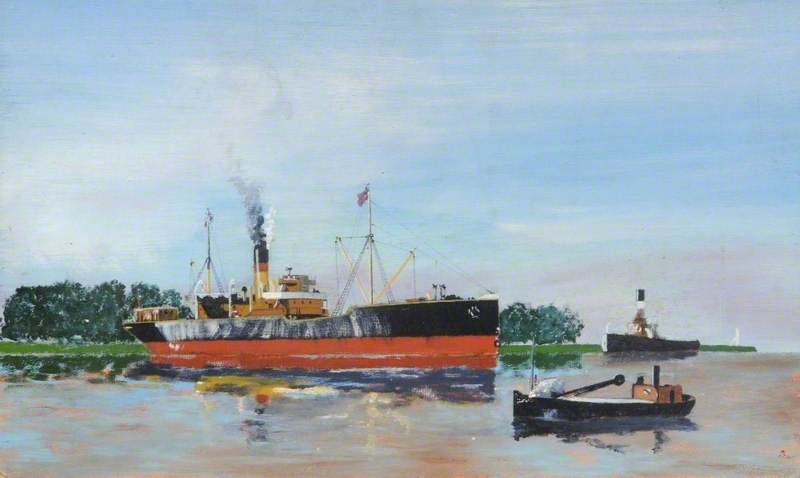
- SS Dearne, by A. J. Jansen

History
- Name: 1909–1915: SS Dearne
- Operator: 1909–1914: Lancashire and Yorkshire Railway; 1914–1915: Government of Germany
- Port of registry: (United Kingdom)
- Builder: Swan Hunter
- Yard number: 808
- Launched: 10 February 1909
- Completed: March 1909
- Fate: Sunk 22 December 1915 by British submarine in North Sea

General characteristics
- Tonnage: 984 gross register tons (GRT)
- Length: 240.2 feet (73.2 m)
- Beam: 34.1 feet (10.4 m)
- Draught: 15.4 feet (4.7 m)

SS Dearne was a freight vessel built for the Lancashire and Yorkshire Railway in 1909.

== History ==
It was built by Swan Hunter and Wigham Richardson in Neptune Yard, Low Walker for the Lancashire and Yorkshire Railway and launched on 10 February 1909 by Mrs Atkin, wife of Captain Atkin RNR.

On 17 February 1913, the Goole dockers' strike started on the Dearne when 100 unionists stopped first on the Dearne and then marched to other steamers. In total 400 workers went on strike.

Served mainly on Hamburg route and left on its last voyage for the Lancashire and Yorkshire Railway on 25 July 1914. It began its return passage from Hamburg, but was sent back to discharge part of its cargo and was seized by Germany. . It then operated for the German Government until it was torpedoed on 22 December 1915.
