= SS Rother =

History
- Name: 1914–1956: SS Rother
- Operator: 1914–1922: Lancashire and Yorkshire Railway; 1922–1923: London and North Western Railway; 1923–1932: London, Midland and Scottish Railway; 1948–1956: British Railways
- Port of registry: (United Kingdom)
- Builder: Clyde Shipbuilding Company Port Glasgow
- Yard number: 308
- Launched: 18 March 1914
- Fate: Scrapped 27 September 1956

General characteristics
- Tonnage: 1,098 gross register tons (GRT)
- Length: 240 feet (73 m)
- Beam: 34.1 feet (10.4 m)
- Draught: 15.3 feet (4.7 m)

SS Rother was a freight vessel built for the Lancashire and Yorkshire Railway in 1914.

== History ==
The ship was built by Clyde Shipbuilding Company Port Glasgow for the Lancashire and Yorkshire Railway and launched on 18 March 1914. She was fitted with refrigeration equipment and intended for the Goole to Hamburg services.

In 1920 three boys from Copenhagen stowed away in the hold. They were discovered shortly after departure, otherwise they would have frozen to death. Goole Magistrates ordered their return to Copenhagen.

In 1922 she transferred to the London and North Western Railway and in 1923 to the London, Midland and Scottish Railway.

She was acquired in 1948 by British Railways and remained in service until 27 September 1956 when she arrived at Dunston on Tyne for scrapping.
