= MV Craigantlet =

Coordinates: 54.8612°N 5.1460°W

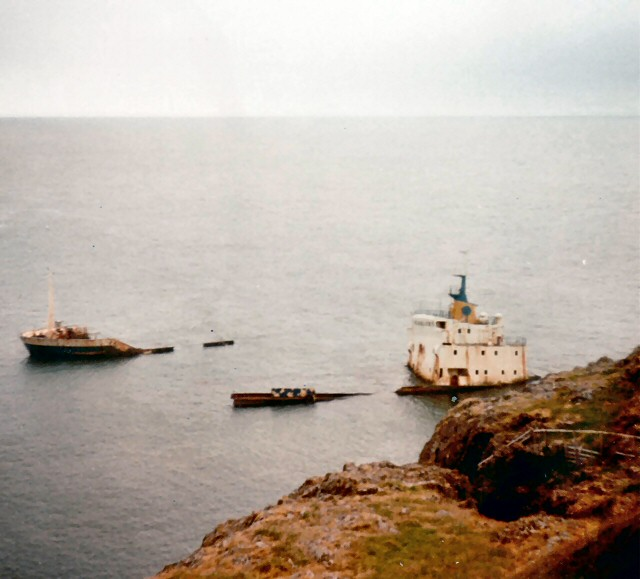
The wreck of the MV Craigantlet

MV Craigantlet was a German-owned, Cyprus-registered container ship operated on time-charter by Cawoods Containers Ltd of Belfast. She ran aground on 26 February 1982 at Killantringan Lighthouse in Portamaggie Bay, Wigtownshire in southwestern Scotland. The 800 ton cargo ship was bound to Liverpool from Belfast at the time. The lighthouse keeper raised the alarm, and Craigantlet's crew was rescued via airlift by a Sea King from 819 Squadron based at the stone frigate HMS Gannet at Glasgow Prestwick International Airport.

Because the Craigantlet carried some containers marked with hazardous material codes — and reportedly some containers mislabeled as empty that were not — there was concern that a dangerous chemical spill could occur. The immediate area was evacuated and an unmanned warning light was put in place. The containers were removed over the next six weeks. The wreck of the Craigantlet was left in place, and partial remains of the bow were still visible in 2020 during low tide at Killantringan.
