= SS Alt =

History

United Kingdom
- Name: 1911–1940: SS Alt
- Operator: 1911–1922: Lancashire and Yorkshire Railway; 1922–1923: London and North Western Railway; 1923–1948: London, Midland and Scottish Railway; 1948–1955: British Railways
- Port of registry: (United Kingdom)
- Builder: William Dobson and Company, Walker Yard, Newcastle-upon-Tyne
- Yard number: 175
- Launched: 25 October 1911
- Completed: Dec 1911
- Out of service: January 1955
- Fate: Scrapped

General characteristics
- Tonnage: 1,004 gross register tons (GRT)
- Length: 240.2 feet (73.2 m)
- Beam: 34.2 feet (10.4 m)
- Draught: 15.4 feet (4.7 m)

SS Alt was a freight vessel built for the Lancashire and Yorkshire Railway in 1911.

== History ==
She was built by William Dobson and Company in Walker Yard, Walker, Newcastle upon Tyne, England for the Lancashire and Yorkshire Railway and launched on 25 October 1911.

In May 1916 she was in collision with the French steamer Iles Chausey. The Iles Chausey sank with six men missing.

In 1922 she transferred to the London and North Western Railway and in 1923 to the London, Midland and Scottish Railway.

On 2 June 1932, whilst in the west dock in Goole, there was a serious fire in the store room adjacent to the engine room.

In 1948 she was taken over by the British Transport Commission. She was scrapped in January 1955.
