= SS Ouse (1911) =

British freight vessel

History

United Kingdom
- Name: 1911–1940: SS Ouse
- Operator: 1911–1922: Lancashire and Yorkshire Railway; 1922–1923: London and North Western Railway; 1923–1940: London, Midland and Scottish Railway
- Port of registry: (United Kingdom)
- Builder: William Dobson and Company, Walker Yard
- Yard number: 174
- Launched: 21 September 1911
- Completed: November 1911
- Fate: Sunk 8 August 1940 25 nautical miles (46 km) south of Eastbourne

General characteristics
- Tonnage: 1,004 gross register tons (GRT)
- Length: 240.2 feet (73.2 m)
- Beam: 34.2 feet (10.4 m)
- Draught: 15.4 feet (4.7 m)

SS Ouse was a freight vessel built for the Lancashire and Yorkshire Railway in 1911.

== History ==
She was built by William Dobson and Company in Walker Yard for the Lancashire and Yorkshire Railway and launched on 21 September 1911.

She was requisitioned by the Admiralty between 1917 and 1919 when she operated as a decoy "Q" ship as Rule, Baryta, Cassor and Q35.

On 8 August 1940 she collided with SS Rye in the English Channel off Newhaven whilst avoiding a torpedo fired by S-20 and sank. 23 crew were rescued.
