= SS Don =

Coordinates: 55°20′N 1°18′W

History

United Kingdom
- Name: 1892–1915: SS Don
- Operator: 1892–1905: Goole Steam Shipping Company Limited; 1905–1915: Lancashire and Yorkshire Railway
- Builder: William Dobson and Company, Walker Yard
- Yard number: 54
- Launched: 11 July 1892
- Out of service: 8 May 1915
- Fate: Sunk 8 May 1915

General characteristics
- Tonnage: 939 GRT
- Length: 225.5 ft (68.7 m)
- Beam: 33.3 ft (10.1 m)
- Draught: 15.7 ft (4.8 m)

SS Don was a British freight vessel built for the Goole Steam Shipping Company Limited in 1892.

== History ==
Don was built by William Dobson and Company in Walker Yard for the Goole Steam Shipping Company Limited and launched on 11 July 1892. She was obtained by the Lancashire and Yorkshire Railway in 1905.

During World War I, Don was torpedoed and sunk in the North Sea 7 nautical miles (13 km; 8.1 mi) east of Coquet Island by the Imperial German Navy submarine U-9 on 8 May 1915. Her crew survived.
