= SS Douglas (1907) =

History
- Name: 1907–1937: SS Douglas; 1937: SS Nepheligeretis; 1937: SS Stancourt; 1938: SS Hermes; 1938: SS Suzy; 1938–1940: SS Ioanna
- Operator: 1907: Goole Steam Shipping Company; 1907–1922: Lancashire and Yorkshire Railway; 1922–1923: London and North Western Railway; 1923–1937: London, Midland and Scottish Railway; 1937: Stanhope Steamship Company; 1937: G.Mavroleon, Greece; 1938: B.Athanassiedes, Piraeus
- Port of registry: (United Kingdom)
- Builder: Clyde Shipbuilding and Engineering
- Yard number: 272
- Launched: 2 February 1907
- Fate: Sunk 1 June 1940

General characteristics
- Tonnage: 950 gross register tons (GRT)
- Length: 236.5 feet (72.1 m)
- Beam: 32 feet (9.8 m)

SS Douglas was a freight vessel built for the Clyde Shipbuilding and Engineering in Port Glasgow for Goole Steam Shipping Company in 1907.

== History ==
She was built by Clyde Shipbuilding and Engineering in Port Glasgow for Goole Steam Shipping Company's Copenhagen service. With her white hull, she was known as one of the "butter boats." She became the property of the Lancashire and Yorkshire Railway in 1907.

In 1922 she became the property of the London and North Western Railway and in 1923, the London, Midland and Scottish Railway.

In 1935 he was the property of Associated Humber Lines. By this time she had her hull colour changed to black.

She was sold in 1937 to the Stanhope Steam Ship Company and renamed Stanhope and later the same year to G M Mavroleon, Greece and renamed Nepheligeretis. In 1938 she was sold to B Athanassiades and renamed Hermes, then Suzy. She was renamed Ioanna in 1940.

On 1 June 1940 she was part of Convoy HG 32F. She straggled behind the convoy. She was shelled and sunk in the Atlantic Ocean 120 nautical miles (220 km) west of Cape Finisterre, Spain by U-37 (Kriegsmarine). All crew were rescued by Cabo Razo (Spain).
