= Yavari (ship) =

British-built Peruvian iron steamship

Coordinates: 15.8259°S 69.9971°W

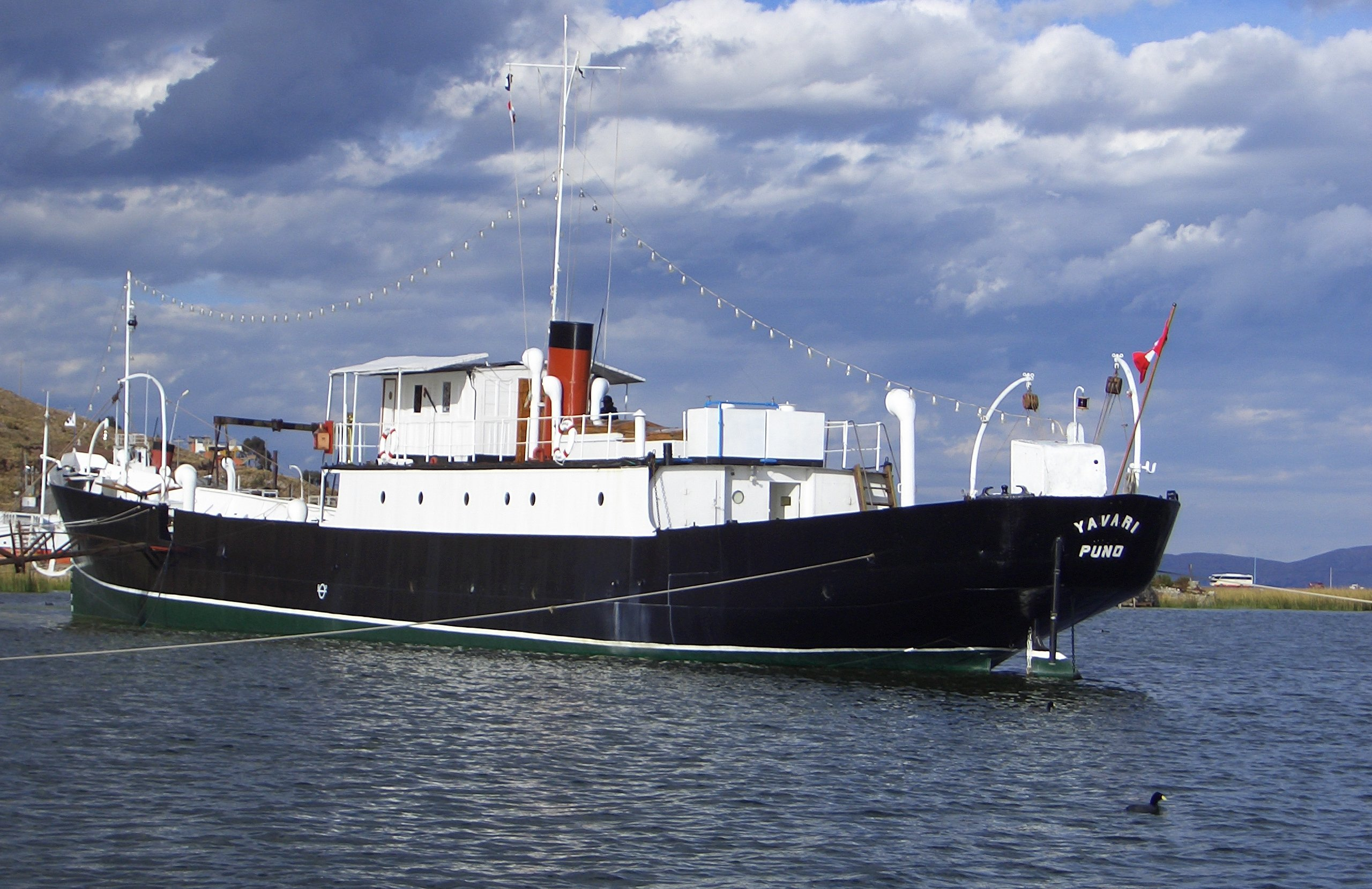
- Yavari at Puno in 2005

History

Peru
- Name: SS Yavari; MV Yavari
- Namesake: Javary River, Peru
- Owner: The Yavari Project
- Port of registry: (Peru) Puno
- Route: across Lake Titicaca
- Ordered: 1860
- Builder: Thames Ironworks and Shipbuilding Company
- Laid down: 1869
- Launched: 1870
- Completed: 1862
- Status: Museum ship

General characteristics
- Displacement: 140
- Length: 100 ft (30 m) when launched in 1870; lengthened to 47.5 m in 1914
- Beam: 5.18 m
- Installed power: 2-cylinder steam engine until 1914; then Bolinder 4-cylinder 320 bhp (240 kW) hot bulb engine
- Propulsion: screw

Yavari is a British-built iron steamship commissioned (along with her sister ship Yapura) by the Peruvian government in 1861 for use on Lake Titicaca by the Peruvian Navy.

She is named after the Javary River in the Loreto Region of Peru, bordering the Amazonas State (Brazil), and was the first steamship to cross the highest navigable waters in the world. Currently the ship functions as a museum and bed and breakfast with bunk accommodation and is the oldest iron lake steamer afloat.

== Construction ==
In 1862 Thames Ironworks in West Ham built the iron-hulled Yavari and Yapura under contract to the James Watt Foundry of Birmingham. The ships were designed as combined cargo, passenger and gunboats for the Peruvian Navy.

The ships were built in "knock down" form; that is, they were assembled with nuts and bolts at the shipyard, dismantled into thousands of parts small enough to transport, and shipped to their final destination to be assembled with rivets and launched on the lake. The kits for the two ships consisted of a total of 2,766 pieces between them. Each piece was no more than 3.5. cwt—what a mule could carry—because the railway from the Pacific Ocean port of Arica went only 40 miles (64 km), as far as Tacna. From there pack mules had to carry them the remaining 220 miles (350 km) to Puno on the lake at 3,812 metres above the sea level.

The original British contractor got the parts to Tacna but failed to complete the section of the journey with mules. This was not resumed until 1868 and the first plates for Yavari's hull were laid at Puno in 1869. Yavari was launched in 1870 and Yapura in 1873.

Yavari was 100 feet (30.5 m) long and had a 60-horsepower (44.7 kW) two-cylinder steam engine, which was fuelled with dried llama dung.

In 1914, Yavari's hull was extended in 15 meters to increase her cargo capacity. At the same time she was re-engined as a motor vessel with a Bolinder four-cylinder 320 bhp (240 kW) hot bulb engine.

== Service history ==
Even though peace had already been signed with the Treaty of Ancón between Peru and Chile to end the War of the Pacific on October 20, 1883, Rear Admiral Lizardo Montero and General César Canevaro resisted in Arequipa. Pursued by Chilean forces, they retreat to Puno and negotiate more support from Bolivia. Upon reaching Puno, on the shore of Titicaca, they boarded with their men the steam gunboats Yavarí and Yapurá, to march towards the lake port of Chililaya, in Bolivia, where General Narciso Campero was waiting for him with two Bolivian battalions to resume hostilities against Chile.

However, a Chilean division arrived in Puno on November 4, 1883 and its local authorities immediately handed over the place, declaring themselves in favor of peace and the government of Miguel Iglesias. The Chilean forces transported by rail from the port of Mollendo to Puno the torpedo boat Colo Colo and launched there into the waters of Lake Titicaca, where it carried out patrolling operations to prevent communications, control the guerrillas and the military use of the lake.

The end of the Pacific War came with an impoverished Peruvian government, so in 1890 UK investors established the Peruvian Corporation which took over the concession to operate Peru's railways and lake ships. In 1975 Peru nationalised the corporation and Yavari and Yapura passed to the state railway company ENAFER. In 1976 they were transferred back to the Peruvian Navy, who converted Yapura into a hospital ship and renamed her BAP Puno but discarded Yavari.

In 1987 charitable interests bought Yavari to restore her. She is now moored at Puno Bay where she provides static tourist accommodation while undergoing full restoration. In 2015, with restoration almost complete, a group of young East Enders sponsored by the West Ham United Foundation trekked over the Andes from Tacna to Puno following the original route of the Yavari. With historian Stephen Pewsey they participated in a "second maiden voyage" on Lake Titicaca, accompanied by the British Ambassador to Peru, H.E. Anwar Choudhury.
