= Earle's Shipbuilding =

British shipbuilding company

Earle's Shipbuilding was an engineering company that was based in Hull, East Riding of Yorkshire, England from 1845 to 1932.

== Earle Brothers ==
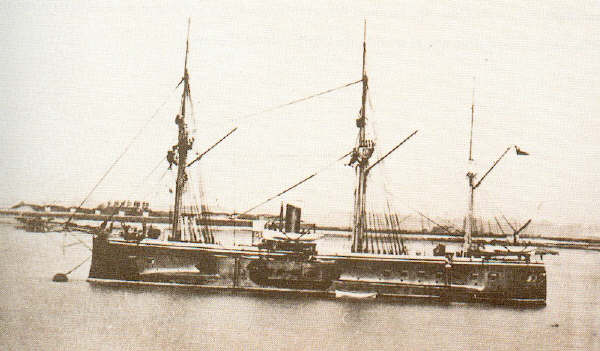
Chilean ironclad Blanco Encalada (1875)

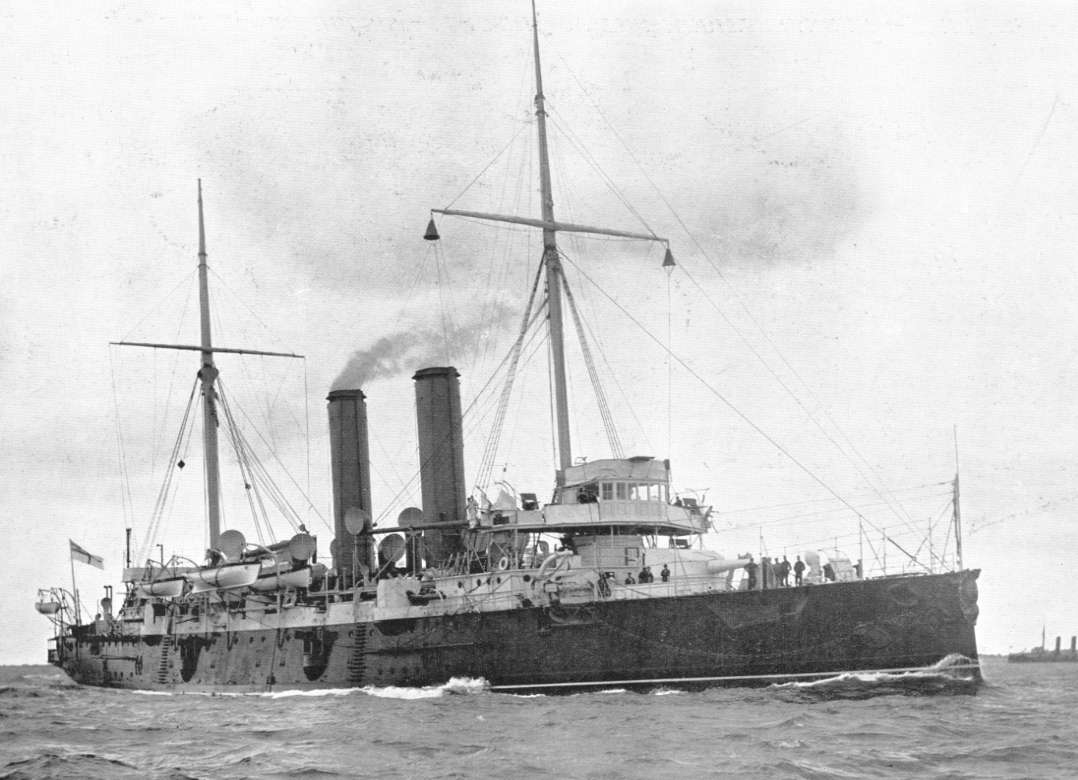
Royal Navy cruiser HMS St George (1892)

The company was started in Hull in 1845 by two brothers, Charles and William Earle. The firm was made up of engineers and focussed on shipbuilding and repair. Its most notable association was with the Wilson Line, for whom the yard produced many ships. Earle's also built vessels for many other British shipping firms, especially those operating on North Sea routes such as the Great Eastern Railway and the Hull & Netherlands Steamship Co. Ltd.

In 1871, Earle's was restructured as a joint-stock company and for a short time Sir Edward James Reed served as its chairman and managing director.

Earle's built two steam yachts for Tsarevitch Alexander: Slavanka in 1873 and Czarevna in 1874. Also in 1874 Earle's built the unsuccessful SS Bessemer, Sir Henry Bessemer's experimental swinging-cabin paddle steamer, which made its maiden (and only) public voyage in 1875. Earle's built the yacht Bosphorous for Khedive Isma'il of Egypt and later built other yachts for wealthy clients.

Earle's was an early adopter of triple-expansion engines, for example installing them in the liner SS Draco that the company built for Wilson Line in 1882.

Reed had been chief constructor to the Admiralty and helped Earle's to win a number of naval orders including the ironclad warships Almirante Cochrane (1874) and Blanco Encalada (1875) for the Chilean Navy Later naval orders included two Edgar-class cruisers for the Royal Navy (RN): HMS Endymion launched in 1891 and HMS St George launched in 1892. In 1895 the company built two Salmon-class destroyers for the RN.

== Liquidation and takeover ==
Earle's faced difficulties when Charles died and William was taken ill. In the latter part of the 1890s, the firm suffered both cash-flow problems and a labour shortage, and in 1900, it entered voluntary liquidation. However, Charles Wilson bought the firm for about £170,000, keeping the Earle's name, but making it a wholly owned subsidiary of Wilson Line.

In 1904, Earle's built SS Inca for the Peruvian Corporation, a UK-owned company that ran Peru's railways. She was built as a "knock down" ship; that is, she was bolted together at Earle's shipyard, then all her parts were marked with numbers, unbolted and packed into crates, and then shipped in kit form to Peru, where they were transported inland, reassembled with rivets, and in 1905 launched on Lake Titicaca, the highest navigable lake in the world. In the 1920s Inca needed a new bottom, so Earle's made one in kit form and shipped that to Peru as well.

In 1929, Earle's built a larger "knock down" ship for the Peruvian Corporation, SS Ollanta, which was launched on Lake Titicaca in 1931. By now, manufacturing in the UK was declining in the Great Depression and after Ollanta, Earle's built only three more ships. The UK government sponsored a rationalisation of the shipbuilding industry, and in 1932, the National Shipbuilders Securities (NSS) took over Earle's. NSS sold Earle's tools and machinery, shipping the yard's large crane and other equipment to Kowloon in Hong Kong. The terms of Earle's closure included a restrictive covenant on the site of the yard proscribing any shipbuilding there for the following 60 years.

== Surviving Earle's ship ==
At least one Earle's-built ship survives. Ollanta, now retired from scheduled ferry service, is leased out by PeruRail for charter tourist cruises on Lake Titicaca.
