= Humber Ferry =

Ferry service on the Humber, northeast England

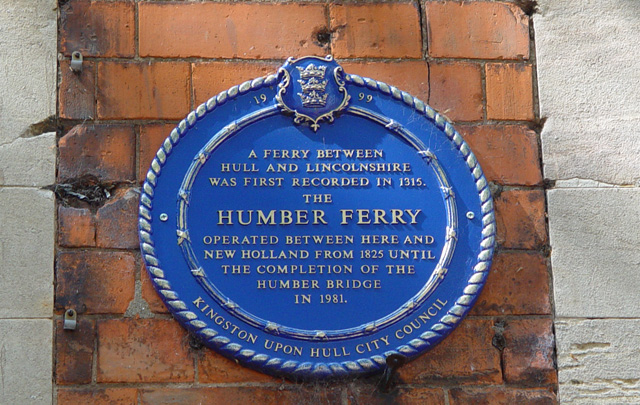
- Locale: England
- Waterway: Humber
- Began operation: 1315
- Ended operation: 24 June 1981

The Humber Ferry was a ferry service on the Humber between Kingston upon Hull, East Riding of Yorkshire and New Holland, Lincolnshire, England, which operated until the completion of the Humber Bridge in 1981.

== History ==
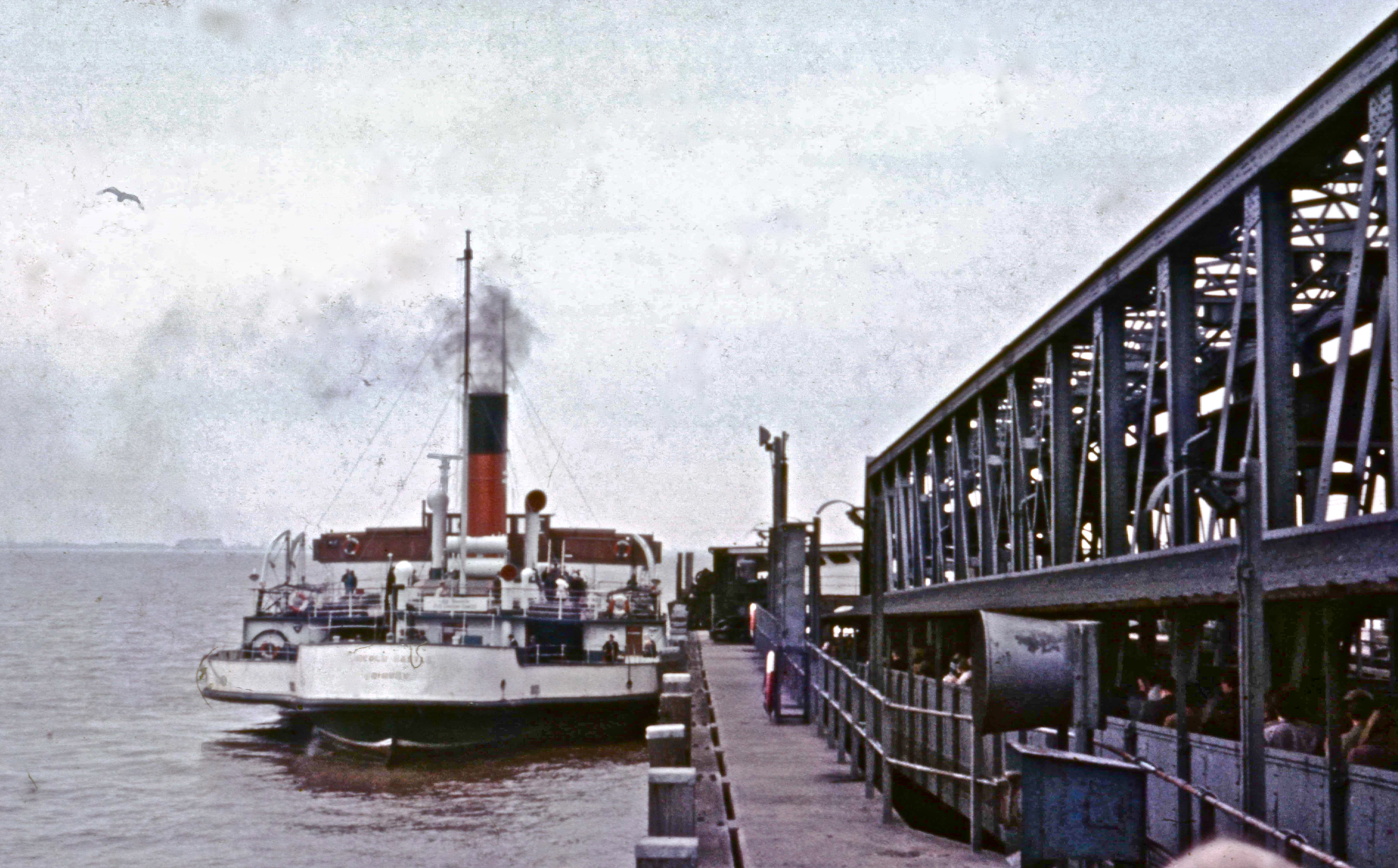
PS Lincoln Castle at New Holland Pier railway station

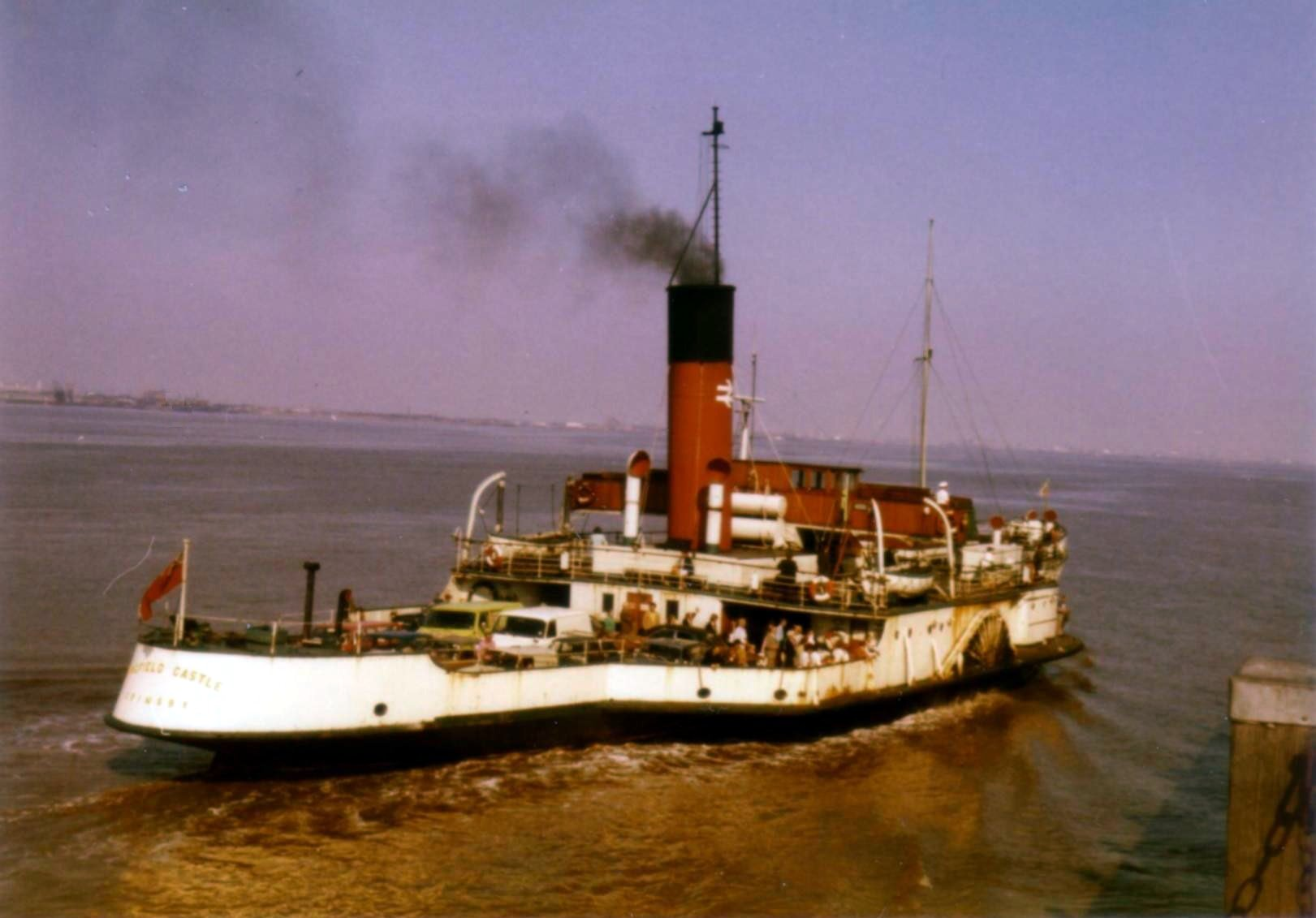
PS Wingfield Castle on the Humber

The Norse-derived names of North Ferriby and South Ferriby suggest a ferry between them across the Humber Gap.

The first record of a ferry across the Humber dates from 1315 when the Warden and Burgesses of Hull were granted a charter by King Edward II to run a ferry between Hull and Barton in Lincolnshire. Pedestrians were halfpenny each, horses one penny and a cart with two horses twopence.

The Corporation of Hull purchased the leases for £3,000 in 1796 (£212,333 in 2015) and both were relet in 1815.

In 1826 a new service started by the New Holland Proprietors between Hull and New Holland. In 1832 they launched a paddle steamer called Magna Charta. In his A Picturesque Tour to Thornton Monastery, John Greenwood writing in 1835 records that the steam packet leaves Hull at seven, a quarter past eleven and four o’clock, and leaves New Holland at nine, two and seven o’clock in the evening.

In 1845 the Great Grimsby and Sheffield Junction Railway bought out the ferry services for £10,000 (£761,049 in 2015). The Barton upon Humber service was withdrawn in 1851.

The railway company built a new pier at New Holland some 1,500 feet (460 m) in length with the railway station, allowing direct connection with the ferry service. New Holland Pier railway station opened on 1 March 1848.

The management transferred to the British Transport Commission in 1948 and on 1 January 1959 management of transferred to Associated Humber Lines.

The Hull to New Holland ferry service finished on 24 June 1981 with the opening of the Humber Bridge.

=== Ships ===
This list is not complete. There was an additional ship introduced in the 1970s which was diesel powered, DEPV Farringford. She was previously used as a ferry between the mainland and the Isle of Wight.

The vessels operated by the Humber Ferry service – all paddle steamers to cope with the shallow shifting sands of the Humber – were:

Ship	Launched	Tonnage (GRT)	Notes and references
PS Magna Charta	1832		Two ships have been named the Magna Charta. The first was launched in 1832 and disposed of in 1873 and the second ordered in 1873 and in use until 1920.
PS Falcon	unknown		Converted to a goods boat in 1849.
PS Prince of Wales	1842	81	Built by Ditchburn and Mare in 1842. Purchased from the Greenwich Steam Packet Company in 1848. Sold in 1855.
PS Queen	1842	78	Built by Ditchburn and Mare in 1842. Purchased from the Greenwich Steam Packet Company in 1848. Sold in 1857.
PS Manchester	1849	291	Built in 1849 by Robinson and Russell, Millwall. Entered service in 1849. Superseded by another ship of the same name in 1855. Renamed Old Manchester in 1855. Sailed between Garston and Liverpool in 1858–1859. Sold 1864.
PS Sheffield	1849	244	Built in 1849 by H. E. Smith, Gainsborough. Entered service in 1849. Superseded by another ship of the same name in 1855. Renamed Old Sheffield in 1855. Sold 1863.
PS Manchester	unknown	174	Former Clyde Steamer. Purchased in August 1854. Entered service in 1855 on the Humber Ferry. Scrapped in 1874.
PS Sheffield	1855	149	Built by Martin Samuelson and Company in 1855. Entered service in 1855 on the Humber Ferry. Laid up in 1864. Sold in 1865.
PS Royal Albion	1855		Built in 1855 as a tug, occasionally used on ferry services. Out of service by 1888.
PS Liverpool	1855	220	Built in 1855 by M. Samuelson and Company, Hull. Passed to the Great Central Railway. Sold for scrap in 1905.
PS Doncaster	1856	216	Built in 1856 by M. Samuelson and Company, Hull. Passed to the Great Central Railway. Sold for scrap in 1913.
PS Magna Charta	1873	116	Built as a relief steamer. Passed to the Great Central Railway in 1897 and the LNER in 1923. Scrapped in 1924.
PS Manchester	1876	221	Built in 1876 by the Goole Engineering and Shipbuilding Company. Passed to the Great Central Railway. Scrapped in 1914.
PS Grimsby	1888	351	Built in 1888 by Earle's Shipbuilding in Hull. Passed to the Great Central Railway. Scrapped in 1923.
PS Cleethorpes	1903	302	Built by Gourlay Brothers of Dundee. Sold around 1934 to the Redcliffe Shipping Company and renamed Cruising Queen. Scrapped shortly afterwards.
PS Brocklesby	1912	508	Built by Earle's Shipbuilding in Hull. Sold in 1935 to the Redcliffe Shipping Company and renamed Highland Queen. Scrapped in 1936.
PS Killingholme	1912	508	Built by Earle's Shipbuilding in Hull. Withdrawn in 1934.
PS Tattershall Castle	1934	556	Built by William Gray & Company in Hartlepool. Withdrawn in 1974.
PS Wingfield Castle	1934	550	Built by William Gray & Company in Hartlepool. Withdrawn in 1974.
PS Lincoln Castle	1941	598	Built by A. & J. Inglis in Glasgow. Withdrawn in 1978.
