= Cleethorpes (disambiguation) =

Cleethorpes is a town in North East Lincolnshire, England.

Cleethorpes may also refer to:

- Cleethorpes (borough)
- Cleethorpes (UK Parliament constituency)
- PS Cleethorpes, a ship
