= List of shipwrecks in December 1890 =

The list of shipwrecks in December 1890 includes ships sunk, foundered, grounded, or otherwise lost during December 1890.

== 1 December ==
List of shipwrecks: 1 December 1890
Ship	State	Description
Alice	United States	The schooner was wrecked in a gale at Lingan Head, Nova Scotia, Dominion of Canada.
A. N. Hausen	Denmark	The steamship ran aground in the Daugava.
Arthur	United Kingdom	The steamship ran aground at Boston, Lincolnshire. She was on a voyage from Riga, Russia to Boston.
Collmar	Germany	The brig collided with the barque St. Cuthbert (United Kingdom) in the English Channel 25 nautical miles (46 km) off the Owers Sandbank and was severely damaged. Collmar was on a voyage from Hamburg to Puerto Rico. She put in to Portsmouth, Hampshire, United Kingdom.
Costa Rica	United States	The steamship ran aground in the Fuca Strait.
Daniel Marcy'	United States	The schooner foundered off Harborville, Nova Scotia. She was on a voyage from Boston, Massachusetts to Port Williams, Nova Scotia.
Deodata	Netherlands	The barque was driven ashore near "Tolken". Her crew were rescued.
Freigia	Sweden	The barque ran aground at Cardiff, Glamorgan, United Kingdom.
Gudet Tefic	Ottoman Empire	The schooner collided with the steamship SS Minerva (1866) (Austria-Hungary) in the Danube 10 nautical miles (19 km) from its mouth and was severely damaged.
Jessie	United Kingdom	The ship was abandoned in Church Bay, Anglesey.
John	Russia	The schooner collided with the steamship Tolesilla (United Kingdom) 2 nautical miles (3.7 km) off the mouth of the River Tyne and was abandoned by her crew, who were rescued by Tolesilla, which towed John in to the River Tyne.
Mabel	Norway	The tug ran aground and sank at Brettesnes.
Maud Sammons	United States	With no one on board, the steamboat burned at Michigan′s St. Helena Island in Lake Michigan just west of the Straits of Mackinac.
Osmo	Norway	The barque was driven ashore at "Bodo".
Paris	United Kingdom	The steamship caught fire at Havre de Grâce, Seine-Inférieure.
Rosella	United Kingdom	The steamship ran aground at Boston, Lincolnshire. She was on a voyage from Novorossiysk, Russia to Boston. She was refloated. She was refloated on 3 December and taken in to Boston.
Ruth	Norway	The brigantine was driven ashore near Præstø, Denmark. She was on a voyage from Stockholm, Sweden to Rio de Janeiro, Brazil.
Unnamed	Flag unknown	The steamship caught fire in the Atlantic Ocean and was believed to have foundered.

== 2 December ==
List of shipwrecks: 2 December 1890
Ship	State	Description
Edda	United Kingdom	The steamship ran aground on the Blacktail Sand, in the North Sea off the coast of Essex. She was refloated the next day.
Gleaner	United Kingdom	The ship sank in Loch Ranza. Her crew were rescued.
Orion	Russia	The steamship ran aground on the Middlesand, in the Humber and sank. She was on a voyage from Riga to the Humber. She was refloated and taken in to Hull, Yorkshire, United Kingdom.
Rio Formoso	United Kingdom	The steamship ran into the barque Ebbs (Norway) in the Kingroad and was severely damaged. Rio Formoso was towed in to Bristol, Gloucestershire.
Unnamed	Italy	The ship was wrecked at Punta d'Arco, Corsica, France.

== 3 December ==
List of shipwrecks: 3 December 1890
Ship	State	Description
Gladiolus	United Kingdom	The steamship ran aground at Dragør, Denmark. She was on a voyage from Reval, Russia to London. She was refloated and found to be leaky.
Guildford	United Kingdom	The steamship was driven ashore in the Delaware River, Pennsylvania, United States. She was refloated with the assistance of a number of tugs.
John Pew	United States	The schooner was wrecked 15 miles (24 km) east of the East Pass, Santa Rosa Island, Florida.
Nordstjernen	Sweden	The ship caught fire and sank at Cardiff, Glamorgan, United Kingdom.
Skyro	United Kingdom	The steamship ran aground at Bilbao, Spain. She was refloated and put back to Bilbao in a leaky condition.
Vesta	Russia	The schooner ran aground in the Weser at Luneplate, Germany. She was on a voyage from Bremen to Boston.
Unnamed vessels	Flags unknown	A number of ships were driven ashore and wrecked at Alicante, Spain.
Unnamed vessels	Flags unknown	A number of ships were driven ashore and wrecked at Almería, Spain.
Several unnamed vessels	Flags unknown	The ships were driven ashore and wrecked at Dénia, Spain. Their crews were rescued by the Dénia Lifeboat.
Unnamed	France	The ship was driven ashore and wrecked at Dénia with the loss of all hands.

== 4 December ==
List of shipwrecks: 4 December 1890
Ship	State	Description
Ane	Denmark	The schooner ran aground. She was on a voyage from Rotterdam, South Holland, Netherlands to Randers, Norway. She was refloated and put in to "Udbyhoi", Norway in a leaky condition.
J. W. Durant	Dominion of Canada	The schooner was driven ashore near the mouth of the Sand River, Ontario. She was on a voyage from Saint John, New Brunswick to Barbadoes.
River Clyde	United Kingdom	The steamship was holed by ice at Riga, Russia.
Undine	United States	The steamship was wrecked. She was on a voyage from Santa Barbara Island to Santa Barbara, California.

== 5 December ==
List of shipwrecks: 5 December 1890
Ship	State	Description
Abeille	France	The tug collided with Henrietta (France) and sank in the Gironde.
Atalanta	Flag unknown	The steamship was driven ashore at Savannah-la-Mar, Jamaica.
Crane	United Kingdom	The steamship ran aground at Sandhamn, Sweden.
Fearless	United Kingdom	The schooner was driven ashore and wrecked at Gaspé, Quebec, Dominion of Canada.
Fregate	France	The schooner was driven ashore at Dysart, Fife, United Kingdom. She was on a voyage from Gravelines, Nord to Dysart.
Gulf Stream	United Kingdom	The steamship collided with the steamship Josephine (Flag unknown) at Chester, Pennsylvania, United States and was beached. Gulf Stream was on a voyage from Richmond, Virginia to Philadelphia, Pennsylvania.
Gustave Molien	Russia	The barque was towed in to Riga in a waterlogged condition by two steamships.
Hong Kong	United Kingdom	The steamship ran aground on the Azalea Rock, off the south east coast of Perim Island, Aden Colony and was severely damaged. She was on a voyage from Colombo, Ceylon to London.
Leven	United Kingdom	The steamship ran aground in the Elbe. She was on a voyage from Odessa, Russia to Hamburg, Germany. She was refloated on 8 December and taken in to Hamburg.
Puerto Riqueno	Spain	The steamship ran aground in the Elbe at Finkenwerder. She was on a voyage from New Orleans, Louisiana to Hamburg.
Schweden	Germany	The steamship ran aground at Sandhamn and was severely damaged. She was refloated.
Van Raalte	Flag unknown	The steamship was driven ashore near Kenosha, Wisconsin, United States
No. 15	United Kingdom	The tug ran aground off Rye, Sussex. Her crew were rescued. She was on a voyage from Plymouth, Devon to London. She was refloated and sailed for Seaford, Sussex.

== 6 December ==
List of shipwrecks: 6 December 1890
Ship	State	Description
Adam Friberg	Flag unknown	The steamship ran aground on the Kragerø Sand, in the Flensburg Fjord.
Brenda	United Kingdom	The steamship ran aground in the River Avon. She was on a voyage from Bristol, Gloucestershire to Cardiff, Glamorgan. She was refloated and completed her voyage.
Cupid	United Kingdom	The barque was abandoned in the Atlantic Ocean (39°11′N 55°50′W). Her crew were rescued by the steamship Moray (United Kingdom). Cupid was on a voyage from a port in New Brunswick, Dominion of Canada to Buenos Aires, Argentina.
Elsbeth	Norway	The steamship ran aground. She was refloated and taken in to Skjaerhalden.
Hannah	United Kingdom	The schooner foundered on the Corton Sand, off Lowestoft, Suffolk with the loss of all five crew. She was on a voyage from Seaham, County Durham to Ipswich, Suffolk.
Ida	Norway	The barque ran aground at Barrow-in-Furness, Lancashire, United Kingdom. She was refloated and put back to Barrow-in-Furness in a leaky condition.
Janet M'Neil	United Kingdom	The barque arrived at Valparaíso, Chile on fire.
Robert Harrowing	United Kingdom	The steamship ran aground in the Elbe at Blankenese, Germany. She was on a voyage from Taganrog, Russia to Hamburg, Germany. She was refloated and taken in to Hamburg.
Slaronia	Flag unknown	The steamship ran aground in the Elbe at Blankenese. She was refloated and taken in to Hamburg.

== 7 December ==
List of shipwrecks: 7 December 1890
Ship	State	Description
Bendo	United Kingdom	The steamship ran aground in the River Avon.
Cardiff	Argentina	The tug collided with the steamship Paraguay and sank at Buenos Aires.
Doelwyk	Netherlands	The steamship ran aground. She was refloated and taken in to Korsør, Denmark leaking slightly.
Empress	United Kingdom	The steamship ran aground on the Barnard Sand, in the North Sea off the coast of Suffolk. She was refloated with the assistance of twotugs and the Kessingland Lifeboat and taken in to Lowestoft, Suffolk, where she struck the quayside and was severely damaged.
Fortuna	Sweden	The steamship collided with the steamship Hjalmar (Denmark) and sank off Trelleborg. Her crew were rescued by Hjalmar. Fortuna was on a voyage from the Idefjord to Königsberg, Germany.
J. A. Hatry	United States	The schooner was driven ashore and wrecked 15 nautical miles (28 km) west of Coatzacoalcos, Mexico. Her crew were rescued.
La Champagne	France	The steamship collided with the steamship Lisbonense (United Kingdom) off Sandy Hook, New Jersey, United States and was damaged. La Champagne was on a voyage from New York to Havre de Grâce, Seine-Inférieure. She put back to New York.

== 8 December ==
List of shipwrecks: 8 December 1890
Ship	State	Description
Ashlands	United Kingdom	The steamship ran aground in the Danube 14 nautical miles (26 km) from its mouth. She was later refloated.
Borghild	Norway	The barque was wrecked at Codroy, Newfoundland Colony with the loss of thirteen of her fifteen crew.
Durango	Germany	The ship ran aground in the Klotzenloch. She was on a voyage from Hamburg to Vera Cruz, Mexico. She was refloated with the assistance of a tug and found to be leaky.
Helmsley	United Kingdom	The steamship was run into by the steamship Ascupart (United Kingdom) at Cardiff, Glamorgan and was beached.
Kaffir	United Kingdom	The steamship was beached at East London, Cape Colony. She was later refloated and taken in to East London.
Tagus	United Kingdom	The steamship ran aground in the Nieuwe Waterweg at Maassluis, South Holland, Netherlands. She was on a voyage from Santon, Brazil to Rotterdam, South Holland.
Tokio Maru	Japan	The steamship ran aground and was wrecked at Sasebo.
Venus	United Kingdom	The schooner ran aground on the Whiting Sand, in the North Sea off the coast of Norfolk. She was on a voyage from Portmadoc, Caernarfonshire to Kiel, Germany. She was refloated and put in to Harwich, Essex in a leaky condition.

== 9 December ==
List of shipwrecks: 9 December 1890
Ship	State	Description
Euripides	United Kingdom	The steamship ran aground near Rotterdam, South Holland, Netherlands. She was on a voyage from Iquique, Chile to Rotterdam. She was refloated.
Isabel	Norway	The barque was driven ashore. She was on a voyage from Mobile, Alabama, United States to the River Tyne. She was refloated and taken in to the Hampton Roads, Virginia, United States.
Lord Eslington	United Kingdom	The steamship ran aground near Rotterdam. She was on a voyage from Bensiaf, Algeria to Rotterdam. She was refloated with assistance.
Newfield	United Kingdom	The lighthouse tender suffered an onboard explosion off Chebogue, Nova Scotia, Dominion of Canada and was damaged. A crew member was killed and several were injured.
Provincia	United Kingdom	The steamship was driven ashore 17 nautical miles (31 km) east of Odessa, Russia. She was refloated with assistance and resumed her voyage.
Ruthwell	United Kingdom	The barque ran aground near Rotterdam. She was on a voyage from Iquique to Rotterdam. She was refloated with assistance.
Waterlily'	United Kingdom	The barquentine collided with another vessel and sank off The Lizard, Cornwall. She was on a voyage from Runcorn, Cheshire to Plymouth, Devon.

== 10 December ==
List of shipwrecks: 10 December 1890
Ship	State	Description
Ada	United Kingdom	The fishing trawler ran aground and was wrecked in Carmarthen Bay. Her four crew survived.
Alberta Kuhoot	Germany	The lighter was run into by the steamship Sirius (Flag unknown) and sank in the Scheldt off Port-la-Perle, Antwerp, Belgium.
Duchess of Cornwall	United Kingdom	The steamship was driven ashore in Dunraven Bay, Glamorgan. She was on a voyage from Odessa, Russia to Cardiff, Glamorgan. She was refloated with the assistance of two tugs and sailed for Cardiff.
Lady Chandos	United Kingdom	The schooner sprang a leak and was beached at Milford Haven, Pembrokeshire.
Lady Gordon	United Kingdom	The fishing boat ran aground 3 nautical miles (5.6 km) east of Lossiemouth, Lothian.
Louise Jenny	France	The steamship was wrecked at Penmarc'h, Finistère.
Maori King	Queensland	The steamship ran aground in the Brisbane River and was damaged. She was refloated.
Princess	United Kingdom	The steamship caught fire at Cardiff. The fire was extinguished.
Veendam	Netherlands	The steamship ran aground in the Nieuwe Waterweg. She was on a voyage from New York, United States to Rotterdam, South Holland. She was refloated with assistance.
Ville de Paris	France	The barque ran aground at Corinto and sprang a leak.

== 11 December ==
List of shipwrecks: 11 December 1890
Ship	State	Description
Antonio Sultan	United Kingdom	The brig was driven ashore and wrecked at Whitehead, County Antrim. Her five crew were rescued.
Ayr	United Kingdom	The paddle tug was run into by the brigantine George F. (United Kingdom) and sank off Ayr. Her crew were rescued by a fishing boat.
Cariffel	United Kingdom	The steamship ran aground at Maryport, Cumberland on being launched. She was refloated on 14 December.
Clara and Jessie	United Kingdom	The schooner was driven ashore near Rosslare, County Wexford. Her crew were rescued. She was on a voyage from Wexford to Cardiff, Glamorgan.
Ellida	Norway	The barque struck the Hamilton Rock. She was on a voyage from Glasgow, Renfrewshire, United Kingdom to a Norwegian port. She was refloated and taken in to Lamlash, Isle of Arran, United Kingdom in a leaky condition. Her crew came ashore, leaving her captain aboard. She sank on 14 December.
Jehanne	France	The steamship collided with Ouse Hopper No. 2 (United Kingdom) and sank in the Humber. Her crew were rescued. Jehanne was on a voyage from Grimsby, Lincolnshire, United Kingdom to Dieppe, Seine-Inférieure.
Mary Johnston	United Kingdom	The brigantine struck the Owers, in the English Channel. She consequently foundered 7 nautical miles (13 km) off St. Catherine's Point, Isle of Wight. Her eight crew survived. She was on a voyage from Guernsey, Channel Islands to London.
Nepaul	United Kingdom	The steamship ran aground on the Shagstone Rocks, in the English Channel off the coast of Devon. Her nine passengers were taken off by a pilot cutter. The paddle tugs Sir Francis Drake and Sir Walter Raleigh (both United Kingdom), the tugs Ætna and Perseverance (both United Kingdom) Trevarno, Triumph and Vixen (all United Kingdom) and the Plymouth Lifeboat went to her assistance. Her crew were taken off by Ætna. Nepaul was on a voyage from Bombay, India to Plymouth, Devon. She was a total loss.
Plymouth Rock	United States	The schooner was wrecked at La Blanche Point, Cape Negro, Nova Scotia, Dominion of Canada.
Pocahontas	United Kingdom	The steamship ran aground in the Savannah River, Georgia, United States. She was refloated and sailed for Genoa, Italy.
Royal Prince	United Kingdom	The steam trawler ran aground at Goswick, Northumberland. She was refloated.

== 12 December ==
List of shipwrecks: 12 December 1890
Ship	State	Description
Agate	United Kingdom	The steamship struck the Bishop Rock, Cornwall. She was on a voyage from Wexford to Neath, Glamorgan. She put in to Holyhead, Anglesey in a sinking condition.
Albert	United Kingdom	The schooner was driven ashore in a strong wind, onto the beach at Porthtowan, Cornwall. Four or her five crew were lost.
Aldborough	United Kingdom	The ship ran aground on the Courland Bank, off Queenstown, County Cork. She was on a voyage from Taltal, Chile to Queenstown.
Amazone	Germany	The schooner caught fire in the North Sea.
Chilian	United Kingdom	The steamship ran aground in the Savannah River, Georgia, United States.
Derato	Norway	The brig ran aground at Dysart, Fife, United Kingdom. She heeled over and was severely damaged. She was on a voyage from Leith, Lothian to East Wemyss, Fife.
Ellida	Norway	The barque was driven ashore and wrecked at Port Ellen, Argyllshire, United Kingdom. Her crew were rescued. She was on a voyage from Belfast, County Antrim, United Kingdom to Drammen.
Fred E. Richards'	United States	The barquentine foundered off Rockport, Massachusetts. She was on a voyage from Philadeplhia. Pennsylvania to Havana, Captaincy General of Cuba.
Governor Willmot	United Kingdom	The full-rigged ship was driven ashore near New York, United States. She was on a voyage from Hamburg, Germany to New York. She was refloated on 14 December.
Hollinwood	United Kingdom	The ship ran aground on the Courland Bank. She was on a voyage from San Francisco, California, United States to Hull, Yorkshire. She was refloated.
Hydra	United Kingdom	The steamship ran aground in the River Thames at Gravesend, Kent whilst avoiding a collision with another vessel. She was on a voyage from London to Boulogne, Pas-de-Calais, France.
Hope	United Kingdom	The schooner ran aground on the Cross Sand, in the North Sea off the coast of Norfolk. She was refloated and taken in to Great Yarmouth, Norfolk.
Idlewild	United Kingdom	The steamship collided with, and sank, a canal boat in the River Thames and then ran aground at Blackwall, London.
John Wells	United Kingdom	The steamship ran aground on the Suikerplaat and broke in two. She was on a voyage from Antwerp, Belgium to Goole, Yorkshire.
Saint Asaph	United Kingdom	The steamship ran aground in the Nieuwe Diep. She was on a voyage from Savannah, Georgia, United States to Bremen, Germany. She was later refloated.
Plover	United Kingdom	The steamship collided with the steamships Paradox and SS Scoresby (1872) (both United Kingdom) in the River Thames at Gravesend, Kent and was beachyed. Plover was on a voyage from Palermo, Sicily, Italy to London. She was refloated and taken in to Gravesend.
Sandfield	United Kingdom	The steamshipr ran aground in the River Thames at Greenhithe, Kent.
Seamew	Royal Navy	The gunboat collided with the Nore Lightship ( Trinity House). She put in to Sheerness, Kent.
Spark	United Kingdom	The steamship caught fire at in the Humber and was beached. The fire was extinguished with the assistance of a number of tugs. She was refloated and taken in to Hull, Yorkshire in a severely damaged condition.
Stella M. Kenyon	United States	The ship ran aground and sank off Barren Island, New York.
Therese Heymann	United Kingdom	The steamship ran aground 17 nautical miles (31 km) east of Odessa, Russia. She was refloated and taken in to Odessa.
Vesterbotten	Norway	The barque was driven ashore and wrecked at Port Ellen. Her crew were rescued. She was on a voyage from Liverpool, Lancashire, United Kingdom to Christiania.
Vivo	United Kingdom	The steamship was driven ashore on Tiree, Inner Hebrides. She was a total loss.

== 13 December ==
List of shipwrecks: 13 December 1890
Ship	State	Description
Albatross, and Scoresby	United Kingdom	The steamship Albatross collided with the steamships Scoresby and Trevithick (United Kingdom) in the River Thames. Albatross and Scoresby were severely damaged.
Bywell, and Vildosala	United Kingdom	The colliers, both steamships, collided in the River Thames at Gravesend, Kent. Both vessels were severely damaged and beached, Bywell having also collided with the steamship Volmer (Denmark). Bywell was refloated on 23 December.Vildosala was refloated and taken in to Tilbury, Essex.
Carmarthenshire	United Kingdom	The steamship collided with the steamships Hawthorn and Persia (both United Kingdom) in the River Thames and was severely damaged. Carmarthenshire was on a voyage from a Japanese port to London.
Jumna	United Kingdom	The steamship suffered a fractured steam pipe at London. Three of her crew were killed, and three were severely wounded.
Onward	United Kingdom	The schooner was wrecked on the south coast of the Isle of Bute, Buteshire. Her crew were rescued by a steamship.
Petrel	United Kingdom	The schooner was wrecked on the south coast of the Isle of Bute. Her crew were rescued by a steamship.
Persia	United Kingdom	The steamship ran aground in the River Thames. She was on a voyage from Calcutta, India to London. She was refloated with assistance from the tugs Undaunted and Woodcock (both United Kingdom).
Pladda	United Kingdom	The steamship was driven ashore 1 nautical mile (1.9 km) east of Crail, Fife. All 27 people on board were rescued by a fishing yawl. She was on a voyage from the River Tyne to Dundee, Forfarshire.
HMS Seamew	Royal Navy	The gunboat collided with the steamship Camel (United Kingdom) off the Nore.

== 14 December ==
List of shipwrecks: 14 December 1890
Ship	State	Description
Bedstonhill	United Kingdom	The full-rigged ship ran aground at Queenstown, County Cork. She was on a voyage from San Francisco, California, United States to Hull, Yorkshire. She was refloated with assistance.
Clynder	United Kingdom	The barque was driven ashore 6 nautical miles (11 km) east of Kirkcudbright. She was on a voyage from the New Hebrides to Bowling, Dunbartonshire.
Haldis	Norway	The ship was driven ashore at Kragershohnen. Her crew were rescued. She was on a voyage from Boulogne, Pas-de-Calais, France to Fredrikstad.
James Hall	United Kingdom	The schooner was driven ashore at Cromarty.
Lottie	United Kingdom	The schooner was driven ashore at Twillingate, Newfoundland Colony. She was refloated and found to be severely leaky.
Pride of Beaumaris	United Kingdom	The schooner was driven ashore at Tenby, Pembrokeshire. She was refloated and taken in to Tenby in a leaky condition.
Rose	United Kingdom	The schooner was driven ashore and wrecked at shire.
Wolgast	Germany	The brig collided with the steamship Wylam and was severely damaged. Wolgast was on a voyage from King's Lynn, Norfolk, United Kingdom to Danzig. She was towed in to Gothenburg, Sweden by Wylam. Wolgast was consequently condemned.
Unnamed	France	The schooner collided with the steamship Strathlyon (United Kingdom) and sank off Breaksea Pointl Glamorgan, United Kingdom. Her crew were rescued.

== 15 December ==
List of shipwrecks: 15 December 1890
Ship	State	Description
Cambodge	France	The steamship collided with the steamship George Lockett (United Kingdom) in the River Thames and was beached. Cambodge was on a voyage from London, United Kingdom to Marseille, Bouches-du-Rhône. She was refloated on 18 December and taken in to Greenhithe, Kent.
Crescent	United Kingdom	The schooner ran aground in the Black Oak River at Newport, County Mayo and was holed. She was on a voyage from Liverpool, Lancashire to Newport. She was refloated and found to be severely leaky.
Crystal	United Kingdom	The steamship ran aground in the River Tay. She was on a voyage from Leith, Lothian to Dundee, Forfarshire. She was refloated and taken in to Dundee.
Ferndale	United Kingdom	The steamship was destroyed by fire off Lopez Island, Washington, United States. Her crew survived.
Grace C. Young	United States	The schooner was dismasted in a gale on Banquereau and became waterlogged. As the crew prepared to abandon ship on 17 or 18 December they were rescued by Elbrug (Germany).
Hebe	United Kingdom	The steamship was driven ashore at St. Bees Head, Cumberland. Her crew were rescued. She was on a voyage from Widnes, Cheshire to Workington, Cumberland.
Scottish Maid	United Kingdom	The fishing boat foundered in the North Sea off the coast of Kincardineshire with the loss of all four crew.

== 16 December ==
List of shipwrecks: 16 December 1890
Ship	State	Description
Pansilippo	United Kingdom	The schooner collided with the schooner Ellen (United Kingdom) off the Tuskar Rock and was abandoned by her crew, who were rescued by Ellen. Pansilippo was subsequently towed in to Wexford by the tug Wexford (United Kingdom).

== 17 December ==
List of shipwrecks: 17 December 1890
Ship	State	Description
Atalanta	United States	The barque broke in two in the Pacific Ocean. Her crew survived. She was on a voyage from Port Gamble, Washington to San Francisco, California.
Convatino Hydra	Greece	The brig was wrecked. She was on a voyage from Batoum, Russia to Alexandria, Egypt.
Lance	United Kingdom	The cutter collided with the steamship Ethel (United Kingdom) and sank in the Bristol Channel off the coast of Glamorgan.
Topsy	Flag unknown	The ship was wrecked on Cayman Brac, Cayman Islands.
Vasso	Greece	The brig was wrecked. She was on a voyage from Batoum to Alexandria.
Ybarra No.4	Spain	The steamship ran aground at Bilbao.
Unnamed	United Kingdom	The schooner was run down and sunk in the Firth of Clyde off Great Cumbrae, Argyllshire by the tug Mariner (United Kingdom). Her crew were rescued by another schooner.

== 18 December ==
List of shipwrecks: 18 December 1890
Ship	State	Description
Birling	United Kingdom	The steamship ran aground on the Pennington Spit, in the English Channel off the coast of Hampshire. She was on a voyage from Newport, Isle of Wight to Liverpool, Lancashire. She was refloated the next day and resumed her voyage
Budapest	Austria-Hungary	The steamship foundered in the Atlantic Ocean off Ouessant, Finistère, France. Her crew were rescued. She was on a voyage from Kiel, Germany to Messina, Sicily, Italy.
Coquette	United Kingdom	The fishing trawler collided with the steamship Fairway (United Kingdom) and sank 12 nautical miles (22 km) north west of the Eddystone Lighthouse, Cornwall with the loss of four of her five crew
Lake Washington	United States	The ship was destroyed by fire at New Orleans, Louisiana.
Pilgrim	United Kingdom	The schooner foundered off St. Ives, Cornwall with the loss of all four crew.
Pyrrha	United Kingdom	The steamship ran aground on the Gunfleet Sand, in the North Sea off the coast of Essex. She was refloated, but subsequently ran aground on the Maplin Sand and broke in two. Her crew survived She as on a voyage from South Shields, County Durham to London.
Rose	United Kingdom	The schooner was wrecked at Seafield Point, County Clare. Her crew were rescued. She was on a voyage from Seafield, County Clare to Bowling, Dunbartonshire.
Science	United Kingdom	The steamship ran aground in the Dardanelles. She was refloated.
Twin Sisters	United Kingdom	The derelict schooner was towed into Liverpool, Lancashire.
Wave	United Kingdom	The steamship ran aground in the Elbe at Falkenthal, Germany. She was on a voyage from Odessa, Russia to Hamburg, Germany. She was refloated and taken in to Hamburg.

== 19 December ==
List of shipwrecks: 19 December 1890
Ship	State	Description
Albert	United Kingdom	The schooner was wrecked at Porthtowan, Cornwall with the loss of all hands.
Bilbao	United Kingdom	The steamship ran aground at Bilbao, Spain. She was refloated and taken under tow, but the tow broke and she drove ashore at Las Arenas. Her crew were rescued by the Las Arenas Lifeboat. She broke in two on 22 December.
Busy Bee	United Kingdom	The schooner was driven ashore at Templepatrick, County Down. Her five crew survived. She was on a voyage from Bridport, Dorset to Ayr. She was refloated on 21 December and taken in to Donaghadee, County Down.
Bute	United Kingdom	The steamship was driven ashore and wrecked at the Mull of Kintyre, Argyllshire. Her crew were rescued. She was on a voyage from Liverpool, Lancashire to Stornoway, Isle of Lewis.
Catherine	United Kingdom	The schooner was driven ashore and wrecked at Baggy Point, Devon. Her five crew were rescued b the steamship Alice (United Kingdom). Catherine was on a voyage from Newquay, Cornwall to Sydney, New South Wales.
Celestina	Italy	The barque was driven ashore and wrecked in Ballycroneen Bay. Her crew survived. She was on a voyage from Buenos Aires, Argentine to Queenstown, County Cork, United Kingdom.
Dinorah, and Mount Stewart	Norway; United Kingdom	The steamship Mount Stewart collided with the barque Dinorah in the English Channel off the Royal Sovereign Lightship ( Trinity House). Both vessels sank. The steamship's crew were rescued. The barque's crew were rescued by another steamship. Mount Stewart was under tow from Sunderland, County Durham to Santander, Spain.
Endeavour	United Kingdom	The ketch was wrecked off Ilfracombe, Devon. Her crew were rescued by a pilot boat. She was on a voytage from Newport, Monmouthshire to Bude, Cornwall.
Faith	United Kingdom	The dandy was wrecked on the Godrevy Rocks, Cornwall with the loss of all hands.
Garron Tower	United Kingdom	The steamship collided with a barque and sank in the English Channel off Beachy Head, Sussex. Her fourteen crew were rescued by the steamship Bessemer (United Kingdom) and the barque.
Hanna	United Kingdom	The ship was driven ashore and wrecked at Tara, County Down. She was on a voyage from Liverpool to Christiania, Norway.
Islay	United Kingdom	The steamship was driven ashore and wrecked 1 nautical mile (1.9 km) north of Cushendun, County Antrim. All on board survived. She was on a voyage from Glasgow, Renfrewshire to Islay.
John Stockham'	United States	The schooner foundered off Faulkner's Island, Connecticut. She was on a voyage from Hoboken, New Jersey to Newport, Rhode Island.
Lazaren	Flag unknown	The steamship was driven ashore near Constantinople, Ottoman Empire. She was on a voyage from Alexandria, Egypt to Odessa, Russia.
Liver	United Kingdom	The ketch was driven ashore and wrecked in Dunraven Bay, Glamorgan.
Maggie Ann	United Kingdom	The steamship foundered off St David's Head, Pembrokeshire. Her crew were rescued. She was on a voyage from Porthgain, Pembrokeshire to Southampton, Hampshire.
Manitoban	United Kingdom	The steamship ran aground in the Delaware River. She was on a voyage from Philadelphia, Pennsylvania to Glasgow. She was refloated and resumed her voyage.
Oregon	United Kingdom	The barque, carrying sodium nitrate from Iquique, Chile to Newcastle upon Tyne, Northumberland became a total wreck after striking the Book rocks, Bigbury Bay, Devon during a south-westerly gale. Her crew were rescued.
Secret	United Kingdom	The schooner was driven ashore at Porthminster, Cornwall. Her crew were rescued by the Porthminster Lifeboat.
Unnamed	Flag unknown	The ship was driven ashore at the entrance to Strangford Lough.

== 20 December ==
List of shipwrecks: 20 December 1890
Ship	State	Description
Calliope	United Kingdom	The steamship was driven ashore at Lemvik, Norway. She was refloated and resumed her voyage.
Eurydice'	United Kingdom	The ship foundered off the George's Bank.
Linn o' Dee	United Kingdom	The steamship was driven ashore near Cuxhaven, Germany. She was on a voyage from Grangemouth, Stirlingshire to Hamburg, Germany.
Newry	United Kingdom	The steamship ran aground near Newry, County Antrim. She was on a voyage from Ardrossan, Argyllshire to Newry.
Vivax	Norway	The barque arrived at Montevideo, Uruguay on fire.

== 21 December ==
List of shipwrecks: 21 December 1890
Ship	State	Description
Bargany	United Kingdom	The full-rigged ship was run into by the steamship Cremon (Germany) in The Downs and was severely damaged. Bargany was on a voyage from Iquique, Chile to Hamburg.
Conquest	(United Kingdom of Great Britain and Ireland) Jersey	The ship ran aground on the Whitburn Steel, off the coast of County Durham. She was refloated and taken in to Sunderland, County Durham.
Drumeltan	United Kingdom	The ship ran aground in the River Liffey. She was on a voyage from San Francisco, California to Dublin. She was refloated.
Glen Gelder	United Kingdom	The steamship collided with the steamship Alert (Norway) in the Bristol Channel off Sully, Glamorgan and was beached. Her seven crew were rescued by the tug Speedwell (United Kingdom). Glen Gelder was on a voyage from Barry, Glamorgan to a Brazilian port. She was refloated on 29 December and towed in to Ely, Glamorgan.
J. M. Smith	United Kingdom	The steamship ran aground on the Middle Sand, in the Humber. She was on a voyage from Alexandria, Egypt to Hull, Yorkshire.
Le Tarn	France	The steamship caught fire at Havre de Grâce, Seine-Inférieure. She was on a voyage from Dunkerque, Nord to Havre de Grâce. The fire was extinguished.
Loanda	United Kingdom	The steamship ran aground at Bermuda.
Moorhen	United Kingdom	The steamship ran aground in the Scheldt. She was on a voyage from Antwerp, Belgium to Odessa, Russia.
Orator	United Kingdom	The steamship was wrecked on the Briggs Reef, off the coast of County Down. Her 26 crew were rescued. She was on a voyage from Glasgow, Renfrewshire to the Isles of Scilly.
Prince of Wales	United Kingdom	The paddle steamer ran aground on the Holewood Bank, in the Belfast Lough. More than 100 passengers were taken off by the ship's boats and the tug Essex (United Kingdom). Prince of Wales was on a voyage from Fleetwood, Lancashire to Belfast, County Antrim. She was refloated and taken in to Belfast.
Victoria	Spain	The brig collided with the steamship Minerva (Flag unknown) at Buenos Aires, Argentina and was severely damaged. Victoria was on a voyage from Cádiz to Buenos Aires.

== 22 December ==
List of shipwrecks: 22 December 1890
Ship	State	Description
Annie Ada	United Kingdom	The barque was wrecked on the Pladdy Rock, off the coast of County Down. She was on a voyage from Ayr to Dublin.
SMS Friedrich Carl	Imperial German Navy	The ironclad ran aground at Mitylene, Lesbos, Greece.
Leonie	France	The brig foundered in the Mediterranean Sea off Toulon, Var with the loss of five of her seven crew.
Olga	Norway	The ship was driven ashore on the coast of County Galway, United Kingdom. She was on a voyage from the Saint Lawrence River to Galway.
Tweed	United Kingdom	The steamship was driven ashore at Sunderland, County Durham. She was on a voyage from London to the River Tyne.
White Jacket	United Kingdom	The steamship ran aground at "Faraman", Bouches-du-Rhône, France. She was refloated.

== 23 December ==
List of shipwrecks: 23 December 1890
Ship	State	Description
Eastern Light	United States	The ship was wrecked on Caucus Shoal (30°18′54″N 87°19′27″W).
Ferdinand Vandertaelen	Belgium	The steamship foundered in the Mediterranean Sea at (37°N 06°E). Her crew were rescued by Caroline Robert de Massey (United Kingdom). Ferdinand Vandertaelen was on a voyage from Odessa, Russia to Antwerp.
Solid	United Kingdom	The ship collided with a steamship off the Rock Light and was severely damaged. She put in to Liverpool, Lancashire in a leaky condition.
Talookdar, and Libusea	United Kingdom; Germany	The full-rigged ship Talookdar collided with Libusea and sank in the Atlantic Ocean with the loss of 23 of her crew. Talookdar was on a voyage from Calcutta, India to London. Libusea was severely damaged. She was on a voyage from Hamburg to Valparaíso, Chile. She put in to Pernambuco, Brazil.

== 24 December ==
List of shipwrecks: 24 December 1890
Ship	State	Description
Forest Princess	United Kingdom	The schooner was wrecked on the Bocas, off the coast of Trinidad. Her crew were rescued. She was on a voyage from London to Trinidad.
Gorji	United Kingdom	The steamship caught fire at Perim, Aden Colony.

== 25 December ==
List of shipwrecks: 25 December 1890
Ship	State	Description
John and Edward	Netherlands	The smack was wrecked on the Shipwash Sand, in the North Sea off the coast of Suffolk, United Kingdom. Her crew reached the Cork Lightship ( Trinity House) in their boat.
Shanghai	United Kingdom	The cargo liner burned near the Mud Fort, Wuhu, China. Between 200 and 300 people were killed. She was on a voyage from Shanghai to Hankow, China.

== 26 December ==
List of shipwrecks: 26 December 1890
Ship	State	Description
A. H. Hurlburt	United States	The coastal schooner was wrecked on Black Point, about 3 miles (4.8 km) south of Narragansett Pier, Rhode Island. Her captain and two crewmen died, the rest of the crew were rescued by the United States Life Saving Service.
Alexandra	Norway	The brig ran aground at Kirkwall, Orkney Islands, United Kingdom. She was on a voyage from Kirkwall to the River Tyne. She was refloated with assistance.
Bill Stowe	United States	The schooner was wrecked at Providence, Rhode island. Her crew were rescued by breeches buoy.
Golconda	United Kingdom	The steamship caught fire at Diamond Harbour, India.
Unity	United Kingdom	The Thames barge ran aground on the Plattes, in the North Sea off the coast of Essex. She was on a voyage from Ipswich, Suffolk to Poole, Dorset. She was refloated with assistance from the tug Merrimac and the yawl Reware (both United Kingdom and escorted in to Harwich, Essex.

== 27 December ==
List of shipwrecks: 27 December 1890
Ship	State	Description
Elizabeth Alice	United Kingdom	The ship ran aground at Runcorn, Cheshire. She was on a voyage from Fowey, Cornwall to Runcorn. She was refloated with the assistance of a number of tugs.
Melbourne	France	The steamship ran aground in the Nieuwe Waterweg at Maassluis, South Holland. She was on a voyage from Odessa, Russia to Rotterdam, South Holland.
Ryelands	United Kingdom	The ship ran aground at Runcorn. She was on a voyage from Charleston, South Carolina, United States to Runcorn. She was refloated with the assistance of a number of tugs.
Saint Asaph	United Kingdom	The steamship caught fire at Bremen, Germany. The fire was extinbuished.

== 28 December ==
List of shipwrecks: 28 December 1890
Ship	State	Description
Dudley Farlin'	United States	The schooner foundered off Bodie Island, North Carolina. She was on a voyage from New York to Charleston, South Carolina.
Speranza	Norway	The barque was driven ashore at Pará, Brazil. She was refloated and taken in to Pará.

== 29 December ==
List of shipwrecks: 29 December 1890
Ship	State	Description
Antelope	United Kingdom	The schooner was driven ashore at Wexford. She was on a voyage from Liverpool, Lancashire to Wexford. She was refloated with assistance from the tug Wexfored (United Kingdom) and taken in to Wexford.
Langoe	United Kingdom	The steamship ran aground off Damietta, Egypt. She was on a voyage from Cardiff, Glamorgan to Colombo, Ceylon.
Lusitania	Portugal	The steamship was driven ashore and wrecked at Sagres.
Merapi	Netherlands	The steamship ran aground in the Nieuwe Waterweg. She was on a voyage from Rotterdam, South Holland to Java, Netherlands East Indies.
Ogmore	United Kingdom	The steamship was driven ashore at Arbroath, Forfarshire. She was on a voyage from Arbroath to Blyth, Northumberland. She was refloated.
Pollux	United Kingdom	The steamship was abandoned in the Atlantic Ocean. She was on a voyage from Rouen, Seine-Inférieure, France to Philadelphia, Pennsylvania, United States.
Ragna	Norway	The barque was driven ashore on Terschelling, Friesland, Netherlands. Her crew were rescued.
Souverain	France	The ship ran aground at in the Gironde at Pauillac, Gironde.
Thessaly	United Kingdom	The steamship caught fire in the North Sea and was abandoned by her crew. She was on a voyage from New Orleans, Louisiana, United States to Hamburg.
Victis	United Kingdom	The schooner ran aground at Margate, Kent and was damaged.
W. I. Radcliffe	United Kingdom	The steamship ran aground in the Nieuwe Waterweg. She was on a voyage from Odessa, Russia to Rotterdam.

== 30 December ==
List of shipwrecks: 30 December 1890
Ship	State	Description
Baron Elibank	United Kingdom	The steamship ran aground in the Weser at Bremerhaven, Germany.
Helena, and an unnamed vessel	United Kingdom	A smack was run into by the steamship Helena (United Kingdom) and sank in the Bute Channel. Helena was beached at Penarth, Glamorgan.
Maria Andrina	Austria-Hungary	The ship foundered in the Adriatic Sea off Pirano with the loss of four of her crew. She was on a voyage from Jamaica to an Austro-Hungarian port.
Marie Eugenie	France	The ship was driven ashore at St. Martin's, Isles of Scilly, United Kingdom. She was on a voyage from Havre de Grâce, Seine-Inférieure to Newport, Monmouthshire, United Kingdom.
Napoli	Germany	The steamship ran aground in the Elbe at Blankenese. She was on a voyage from Newcastle upon Tyne, Northumberland, United Kingdom to Hamburg.
Niobe	Austria-Hungary	The steamship was driven ashore at Heraklion, Crete, Greece. All on board were rescued.

== Unknown date ==
List of shipwrecks: Unknown date in December 1890
Ship	State	Description
Active	Dominion of Canada	The schooner was driven ashore and wrecked at Salmon Cove, Labrador.
Adja J. Bonner	United States	The barquentine was abandoned in the Atlantic Ocean before 12 December. Her nine crew were rescued by the steamship Unionist (United Kingdom). Adja J. Bonner was set afire. She was on a voyage from Rio de Janeiro, Brazil to Baltimore, Maryland.
Admiral	United States	The schooner was wrecked on Bryon Island, Magdalen Islands, Nova Scotia, Dominion of Canada on 11 or 16 December. Her crew was picked up from the island by a steamship three weeks later.
Aghios Vlassios	Greece	The steamship caught fire in the Dardanelles before 10 December and ran aground at Tenedos, Ottoman Empire. The fire was extinguished. She was severely damaged. Aghios Vlassios was refloated on 14 December and resumed her voyage.
Angelina	Italy	The brig was lost in the Atlantic Ocean. Her crew survived. She was on a voyage from St. John's, Newfoundland Colony to Demerara, British Guiana.
Anna	Sweden	The brig was abandoned in the North Sea (57°30′N 7°18′E). Her crew were rescued. She was on a voyage from Oskarshamn to Liverpool, Lancashire, United Kingdom.
Caboodle	United States	The schooner was driven ashore and sank at Saint-Pierre, Saint Pierre and Miquelon. She was later refloated and taken in to Saint-Pierre.
Calliope	United Kingdom	The steamship was driven ashore. She was refloated and taken in to Cardiff, Glamorgan.
Carolina	France	The brigantine was wrecked at Saint-Pierre.
Carricks	Norway	The barque was abandoned at sea with the loss of eleven of her crew. A survivor was rescued by the barque Emma Payzant (United Kingdom). Carricks was on a voyage from Pensacola, Florida, United States to the River Tyne.
Casterton	United Kingdom	The steamship was driven ashore at Cardiff.
Claribel	United Kingdom	The barque ran aground on the Port Prim Reef. She was refloated and towed in to Charlottetown, Prince Edward Island, Dominion of Canada in a severely leaky condition.
Cleddu Belle	United Kingdom	The brigantine was driven ashore at Point Aconi, Nova Scotia, Dominion of Canada. She was refloated and taken in to North Sydney, Nova Scotia in a leaky condition.
Consuelo	United Kingdom	The schooner was wrecked at "Kingsco", Newfoundland Colony. Her crew were rescued.
Coptic	United Kingdom	The steamship ran aground on Main Island at Rio de Janeiro, Brazil, while departing for a voyage to Plymouth, Devon. Her forward compartments flooded, but were repaired by local engineers, and she returned to service.
Corsair	Flag unknown	The schooner was wrecked at Saint-Pierre.
Emeline	United Kingdom	The schooner sank in Old Man's Bay.
E. T. G.	United Kingdom	The barque was driven ashore on Tybee Island, Georgia, United States. She was refloated and taken in to Savannah, Georgia in a leaky condition.
Freden	Norway	The ship was abandoned in the North Sea. Her crew were rescued. She was on a voyage from Newcastle upon Tyne, Northumberland, United Kingdom to Sandefjord.
Hannah	Flag unknown	The schooner was driven ashore at Saint-Pierre.
Hope	Flag unknown	The schooner was driven ashore and wrecked at Spaniard's Bay, Newfoundland Colony.
Irene	France	The barque was abandoned in the Atlantic Ocean. Her crew were rescued by Maravilla (United Kingdom). Irene was on a voyage from South Shields, County Durham, United Kingdom to Valparaíso, Chile.
Lady Clive	United Kingdom	The steamship was driven ashore at Cardiff.
Leonce P.'	France	The brig foundered in the Mediterranean Sea off La Seyne-sur-Mer, Var in late December. She was on a voyage from Porto-Vecchio, Corsica to Marseille, Bouches-du-Rhône.
Lindesnaes	Norway	The barque was abandoned in the Atlantic Ocean. Her crew were rescued by the steamship Holne Eden (Flag unknown). Lindesnaes was on a voyage from Philadelphia, Pennsylvania, United States to Havre de Grâce, Seine-inférieure, France.
Marie	Flag unknown	The schooner was driven ashore at Saint-Pierre.
Northenden	United Kingdom	The steamship was driven ashore. She was refloated on 23 December and taken in to Grimsby, Lincolnshire.
On Time	United Kingdom	The schooner was wrecked in the Cayman Islands. Her crew were rescued. She was on a voyage from Colón, Columbia to Halifax, Nova Scotia, Dominion of Canada.
Peeress	United Kingdom	The brigantine was abandoned at sea. Her crew were rescued by the barque Caswell (United Kingdom). Peeress was on a voyage from Santa Fe to Falmouth, Cornwall.
Planter	Flag unknown	The schooner was driven ashore at Saint-Pierre.
Port Adelaide	United Kingdom	The steamship was driven ashore on Jong Island, Singapore. She was refloated.
Pride of Anglesey	United Kingdom	The schooner was driven ashore. She was refloated and put back to Tenby, Pembrokeshire.
Rheinfels	Germany	The steamship ran aground at Port Said, Egypt. She was on a voyage from Hamburg to Kurrachee, India. She was refloated with assistance and taken in to Port Said.
Rushlight	Flag Unknown	The schooner was wrecked at Saint-Pierre.
Sailors' Home	Flag unknown	The ship sank off Cape Miquelon, Miquelon with the loss of all hands.
Struan	Norway	The full-rigged ship was abandoned in the Pacific Ocean before 24 December. She was on a voyage from Port Discovery, Washington to Melbourne, Victoria.
Talabot	Norway	The steamship ran aground at Hamburg. She was refloated and put back to Hamburg.
Two Sisters	Flag unknown	The brig was wrecked at Saint-Pierre.
Ville de Valence	France	The steamship collided with the steamship Ormesby (United Kingdom) and was severely damaged. She put in to Suez, Egypt.
Vivo	United Kingdom	The steamship was driven ashore and wrecked on Tiree, Inner Hebrides.
Water Lily	United Kingdom	The schooner collided with another vessel and foundered. Her crew were rescued by St. Jean (France).
William D. Daisley	United States	The schooner sailed from Gloucester, Massachusetts for Fortune Bay, Newfoundland Colony and vanished. She was probably lost in a gale in December.
Unnamed	France	The brig was driven ashore in Barn's Bay, Newfoundland Colony.
Unnamed	United Kingdom	The schooner was driven ashore in Barn's Bay.
Unnamed	Flag unknown	The schooner was driven ashore and wrecked at Toad's Cove, Labrador.
Unnamed	(Dominion of Newfoundland) Newfoundland Colony	The schooner was driven ashore and wrecked at Placentia.
Unnamed	(Dominion of Newfoundland) Newfoundland Colony	The schooner was driven ashore and wrecked at Heart's Content.
6 unnamed vessels	Flags unknown	The schooners were driven ashore at "Carboneau".
Many unnamed vessels	Flags unknown	The brigs and schooners were driven ashore at Bay Roberts, Port Degrave, Fox Cove and St. Mary's, Newcoundland Colony.
