= PS Brocklesby =

British paddle steamer (1912–1936)

History
- Name: 1912–1935: PS Brocklesby; 1935–1936: PS Highland Queen
- Operator: 1912–1923: Great Central Railway; 1923–1935: London and North Eastern Railway; 1935–1936: Redcliffe Shipping Company
- Port of registry: (United Kingdom)
- Route: Humber Ferry
- Builder: Earle's Shipbuilding, Hull
- Launched: 22 February 1912
- Out of service: 1936
- Fate: Scrapped 1936

General characteristics
- Tonnage: 508 gross register tons (GRT)
- Length: 195 feet (59 m)
- Beam: 31.1 feet (9.5 m)
- Depth: 8.7 feet (2.7 m)

PS Brocklesby was a British passenger and cargo vessel built for the Great Central Railway in 1912.

== History ==
The ship was built by Earle's Shipbuilding of Hull and launched on 22 February 1912 by Mrs J.A. Roger of Grimsby. She was one of an order for two vessels, the other being Killingholme. She was used on the New Holland to Hull ferry service.

In 1923 she transferred to the London and North Eastern Railway. She was sold in 1935 to the Redcliffe Shipping Company and renamed Highland Queen. She was used on Firth of Forth pleasure cruises, but found unsuitable and scrapped in 1936.
