= PS Grimsby =

Passenger and cargo vessel

History
- Name: PS Grimsby
- Operator: 1888–1897: Manchester, Sheffield and Lincolnshire Railway; 1897–1923: Great Central Railway; 1923–1923: London and North Eastern Railway
- Port of registry: (United Kingdom)
- Builder: Earle's Shipbuilding, Hull
- Launched: 8 December 1888
- Out of service: 1923
- Fate: Scrapped 1923

General characteristics
- Tonnage: 351 gross register tons (GRT)
- Length: 180 feet (55 m)
- Beam: 25.4 feet (7.7 m)
- Depth: 7.4 feet (2.3 m)

PS Grimsby was a passenger and cargo vessel built for the Manchester, Sheffield and Lincolnshire Railway in 1888.

== History ==
The ship was built by Earle's Shipbuilding of Hull and launched on 8 December 1888 by Miss J.M.C. Cook. She was used on the New Holland to Hull ferry service.

In 1923 she transferred to the London and North Eastern Railway. She was scrapped in 1923.
