= SS Warrington (1886) =

History
- Name: SS Warrington
- Operator: 1886–1897: Manchester, Sheffield and Lincolnshire Railway; 1897–1903: Great Central Railway
- Port of registry: (United Kingdom)
- Builder: Swan Hunter
- Yard number: 98
- Launched: 9 June 1886
- Fate: Wrecked 6 December 1903

General characteristics
- Tonnage: 840 gross register tons (GRT)
- Length: 230 feet (70 m)
- Beam: 30.1 feet (9.2 m)
- Depth: 14.6 feet (4.5 m)

SS Warrington was a passenger and cargo vessel built for the Manchester, Sheffield and Lincolnshire Railway in 1886.

== History ==
The ship was built by Swan Hunter and launched on 9 June 1886 by Mrs. Hunter. She was built for the passenger a freight trade between Grimsby and Hamburg. She was the second of an order of two ships from Swan Hunter, the other being Northenden launched on 1 May 1886. The saloon furnishings were fitted with panels of Hungarian ash, the mouldings were of walnut, the stiles of oak with carved oak pilasters and Corinthian capitals. The mouldings throughout the saloon were of carved oak. She was despatched from the River Tyne on 24 July 1886.

In 1897 she was acquired by the Great Central Railway. On Saturday 6 December 1903 she ran aground and was lost on the sands near Happisburgh on the Norfolk Coast. The Board of Trade enquiry in January 1904 found that Captain G. H. Morris was guilty of a grave error of judgment in relying solely upon the lights of vessels as evidence of his position.
