= SS Ashton =

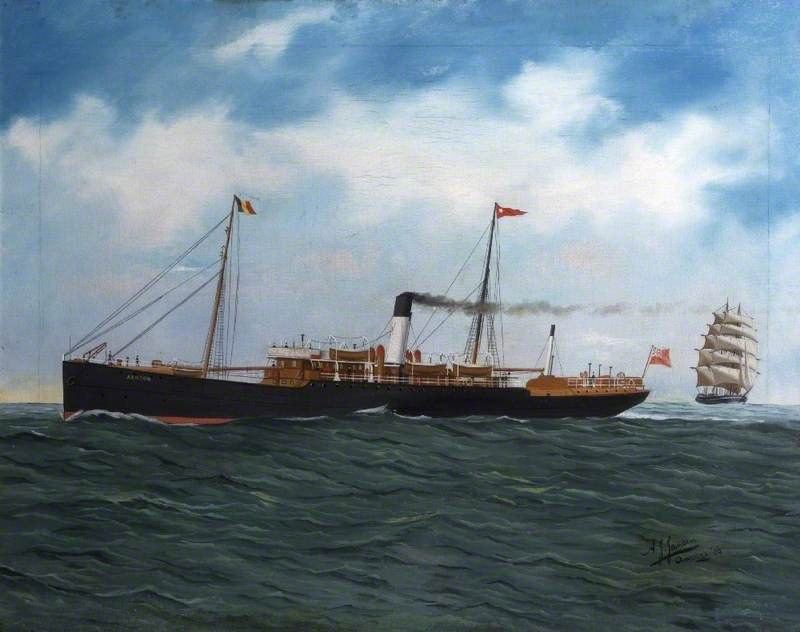
- The Cruiser Ashton, by A. J. Jansen

History
- Name: SS Ashton
- Operator: 1884–1897: Manchester, Sheffield and Lincolnshire Railway; 1897–1916: Great Central Railway; 1916–????: Cadeby Steam Ship Company
- Builder: Edward Withy and Company, Hartlepool
- Launched: 12 June 1884
- Fate: Scrapped 1925

General characteristics
- Tonnage: 1,007 gross register tons (GRT)
- Length: 238.6 feet (72.7 m)
- Beam: 32.3 feet (9.8 m)
- Depth: 14.1 feet (4.3 m)

SS Ashton was a passenger and cargo vessel built for the Manchester, Sheffield and Lincolnshire Railway in 1884.

== History ==
The ship was built by Edward Withy and Company in their Middleton Yard at Hartlepool and launched on 12 June 1884 by Mrs James Huddart of Melbourne. She was designed for the passenger and cargo service between Grimsby and Hamburg.

On 28 August 1887 when the ship had arrived at Antwerp, a sailor entered the coal bunker with an open lantern and caused an explosion which caused considerable damage to the ship of around £2,000. Fortunately there were no serious injuries.

In 1892 Captain W.P Seaton was given a bronze medal by Lloyds for his exertions in saving the lives of two men belonging to the Enterkin, who were discovered clinging to the keel of a capsized boat.

On 14 May 1893 the Sheffield was badly damaged in a collision with the Londoner, and was only kept afloat by her watertight compartments. The Londoner sank but the crew of 36 and 90 passengers were rescued by the Sheffield. The Ashton also came to the scene, and the passengers were transferred for landing them at North Shields.

In 1897 she passed to the Great Central Railway and in 1916 they sold her to the Cadeby Steam Ship Company.
