= PS Magna Charta (1873) =

History

United Kingdom
- Name: PS Magna Charta
- Namesake: Magna Carta, the famous charter signed in 1215
- Owner: 1873-1910: Manchester, Sheffield and Lincolnshire Railway; 1910-1920: Great Central Railway; 1920-1924: LNER
- Route: Humber ferry crossing
- Ordered: 1873
- Builder: Charlton & Co. Ltd, Grimsby
- Yard number: 75372
- Home port: Hull, England
- Fate: Broken up in 1924

General characteristics
- Type: Paddlesteamer
- Displacement: 62 tons
- Length: 98 ft (30 m)
- Beam: 18 ft (5.5 m)
- Draught: 8 ft (2.4 m)
- Installed power: 40 hp (30 kW)
- Propulsion: 1-lever steam engine; Paddle wheel

The PS Magna Charta is a former paddlesteamer ferry built for the Manchester, Sheffield and Lincolnshire Railway in 1873. The Magna Charta was used as a ferry crossing across the Humber estuary from New Holland to Hull and was built by Charlton & Co. Ltd, Grimsby. During the ship's later days, it was used as a relief ferry and a tug boat until it was broken up in 1924.
