= PS Manchester =

History
- Name: PS Manchester
- Operator: 1876–1897: Manchester, Sheffield and Lincolnshire Railway; 1897–1914: Great Central Railway
- Port of registry: (United Kingdom)
- Builder: Goole Engineering and Shipbuilding Company
- Launched: 1876
- Out of service: 1914
- Fate: Scrapped

General characteristics
- Tonnage: 221 gross register tons (GRT)
- Length: 159.7 feet (48.7 m)
- Beam: 18.9 feet (5.8 m)
- Depth: 8.4 feet (2.6 m)

PS Manchester was a passenger and cargo vessel built for the Manchester, Sheffield and Lincolnshire Railway in 1876.

== History ==
The ship was built by the Goole Engineering and Shipbuilding Company and launched in 1876 She was used for the Humber Ferry Service. In 1879 she was used by the Prince of Wales and Princess of Wales when they visited Grimsby for the opening of the New Union Dock. She was painted above the deck-line in black, blue and gold, and on her bows were painted the Prince of Wales’s feathers, and scrolls in a variety of colours, embracing the rose, the shamrock and the thistle.

On Sunday 13 January 1895 the New Holland Pier railway station was destroyed by fire. The Manchester transported her crew from Grimsby to aid with the rescue efforts.

She was acquired by the Great Central Railway in 1897.

She was scrapped in 1914
