= SS Retford =

History
- Name: TSS Retford
- Operator: 1883–1897: Manchester, Sheffield and Lincolnshire Railway; 1897–1910: Great Central Railway
- Port of registry: (United Kingdom)
- Builder: Earle's Shipbuilding, Hull
- Launched: 20 January 1883
- Fate: Scrapped 1910

General characteristics
- Tonnage: 951 gross register tons (GRT)
- Length: 230.6 feet (70.3 m)
- Beam: 32 feet (9.8 m)
- Depth: 12.9 feet (3.9 m)

TSS Retford was a passenger and cargo vessel built for the Manchester, Sheffield and Lincolnshire Railway in 1883.

== History ==
The ship was built by Earle's Shipbuilding in Hull and launched on 20 January 1883 by Miss Norfolk of Grimsby. She had a top gallant forecastle, bridge and long poop extending to the bridge and there was accommodation under the poop for 30 first-class passengers, the second-class passengers accommodation was forward, and the emigrant's quarter in the fore ‘tween decks. She was schooner rigged, with pole masts, and fitted with water ballast. On one of her early sailing, she made the run between Rotterdam quay and Grimsby dock in 15.5 hours.

In January 1895 she was in collision in dense fog in the River Scheldt with the Swedish steamship Tellestoof which resulted in the foundering of the Tellestoof, but the whole of her crew were saved. The damage to the Retford was not sufficient to prevent her from returning to Grimsby.

In 1903 she rescued the 17 crew of sister ship Huddersfield which had sunk after a collision with the Uto in the River Scheldt.

She was disposed of in 1910.
