= SS Lutterworth =

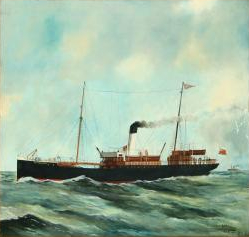
- Painting of Lutterworth by AS Jansen

History
- Name: SS Lutterworth
- Operator: 1891–1897: Manchester, Sheffield and Lincolnshire Railway; 1897–1923: Great Central Railway; 1923–1932: London and North Eastern Railway; 1932–1933: British and Irish Steam Packet Company
- Builder: Earle's Shipbuilding, Hull
- Launched: 8 April 1891
- Out of service: 1933
- Fate: Scrapped 1933

General characteristics
- Tonnage: 1,002 gross register tons (GRT)
- Length: 240.8 feet (73.4 m)
- Beam: 32 feet (9.8 m)
- Depth: 14.8 feet (4.5 m)

SS Lutterworth was a passenger and cargo vessel built for the Manchester, Sheffield and Lincolnshire Railway in 1891.

== History ==
The ship was built by Earle's Shipbuilding in Hull and launched on 8 April 1891 by Mrs. Pollitt, wife of Henry Pollitt the general manager of the Manchester, Sheffield and Lincolnshire Railway. She was described in the Hull Daily Mail of 9 April 1891 as

being constructed of iron for the railway company’s continental passenger and cargo traffic, her dimensions being as follow: Length, 240 feet; breadth, 32 feet; depth 16 feet, and she is arranged with poop- for first-class passengers, long bridge, with officers’ quarters under (forming also shelter for light deck cargo), and top-gallant forecastle for crew. The ship is built to Lloyds’ 100 A1 class, with additions to the scantlings in various parts to meet the requirements of the traffic. The first-class accommodation includes staterooms and beds for 36 passengers, with dining-saloon, smokeroom, ladies’-room, and conveniences, worked out in polished and hard woods, and finished in a tasteful manner. Complete fittings are also provided for 100 emigrants in the forward ‘tween decks. The boats and their outfit, with life-belts, &c., will be in accordance with the provisions of the Life-Saving Applicances [sic] Act of 1888, (Note: Merchant Shipping (Life Saving Appliances) Act 1888 (51 & 52 Vict. c. 24)) which recently came into force. Steam winches and cranes of new and powerful description are fitted, together with all necessary booms and derricks for the rapid working of cargo. Steam steering gear my essrs Amos and Smith is fitted amidships and hand screw gear aft. The cellular bottom of the ship is utilized for water-ballast, and by more complete sub-division than usual this will enable the ship to be trimmed very readily. The vessel will be schooner rigged, with two pole masts and fore and aft canvas. The machinery, also made by Earle’s Company, consists of a set of triple-compound three-crank engines, having cylinders 22in, 35in, and 57in diameter, with a stroke of 42in, and two steel single ended boilers, 14ft 3in mean diameter by 11ft inside length at top, made in accordance with Lloyd’s and the Board of Trade requirements for a working pressure of 170lbs per square inch.

In 1897 she was acquired by the Great Central Railway. On 23 February 1899 the Wilson liner Bruno collided with the Lutterworth which was at anchor off Schulan. She was beached and a diver made temporary repairs to the damage which had been sustained aft.

On 15 February 1901 she went ashore near Hamburg Roads. Despite several attempts to float her off she was stuck fast. The cargo was removed in an attempt to lighten her. She was finally refloated around 2 weeks later.

In 1923 she was acquired by the London and North Eastern Railway who kept her until 1932 when she was sold to the British and Irish Steam Packet Company and scrapped in the following year.
