= PS Magna Charta =

Two ships have been named PS Magna Charta both operating as ferries on the Humber estuary:

- PS Magna Charta (1826) was a wooden paddlesteamer built in North Shields.
- PS Magna Charta (1873) was an iron paddlesteamer built for the Manchester, Sheffield and Lincolnshire Railway.
