= SS Huddersfield =

Passenger-cargo ship

History
- Name: SS Huddersfield
- Operator: 1872–1897: Manchester, Sheffield and Lincolnshire Railway; 1897–1903: Great Central Railway
- Port of registry: (United Kingdom)
- Builder: John Elder and Company, Govan, Scotland
- Yard number: 148
- Launched: 23 September 1872
- Fate: Sunk in collision 26 May 1903

General characteristics
- Tonnage: 1,082 gross register tons (GRT)
- Length: 231 feet (70 m)
- Beam: 30.2 feet (9.2 m)
- Depth: 16.4 feet (5.0 m)

SS Huddersfield was a passenger-cargo ship built for the Manchester, Sheffield and Lincolnshire Railway in 1872.

== History ==
Huddersfield was built by John Elder and Company of Govan, Scotland, and launched on 23 September 1872. In 1897 she passed into the ownership of the Great Central Railway.

On 26 May 1903 on leaving Antwerp, Belgium, she was in collision in the River Scheldt with the Norwegian steamer Uto and sank. All 22 of her passengers – emigrants from Galicia on their way to Canada – drowned. The crew of 17 were rescued by the company ship Retford.
