= PS Killingholme =

History
- Name: PS Killingholme
- Operator: 1912–1923: Great Central Railway; 1923–1945: London and North Eastern Railway
- Port of registry: (United Kingdom)
- Route: Humber Ferry
- Builder: Earle's Shipbuilding, Hull
- Launched: 23 February 1912
- Out of service: 1945
- Fate: Scrapped 1945

General characteristics
- Tonnage: 217 DWT; 508 gross register tons (GRT)
- Length: 195 feet (59 m)
- Beam: 31.1 feet (9.5 m)
- Depth: 8.7 feet (2.7 m)
- Propulsion: 98 hp (73 kW)

PS Killingholme was a passenger and cargo vessel built for the Great Central Railway in 1912.

== History ==
The ship was built by Earle's Shipbuilding of Hull and launched on 23 February 1912 by Mrs Boothby, wife of Captain Boothby. She was one of an order of two new ships, the other being Brocklesby used for the New Holland to Hull ferry service. She was used by King George V and Queen Mary on their visit to open the King George Dock in Immingham in July 1912.

During the First World War she was a seaplane carrier for the Royal Navy, in which capacity she was struck by a torpedo and lost one of her paddles.

She was withdrawn from regular service in 1934, but retained for excursions and as a spare ferry.

During the Second World War she was again requisitioned and used as a barrage balloon depot ship in the Humber.

She was scrapped in 1945.
