= SS Marylebone =

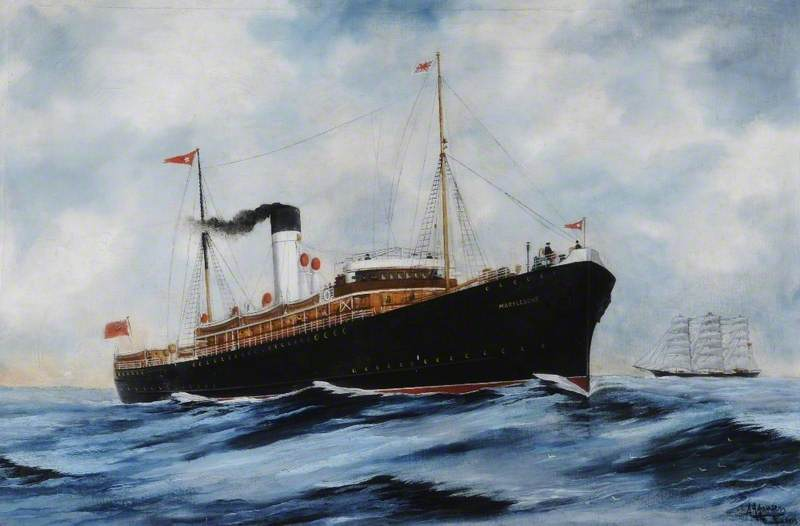
- SS 'Marylebone' (Railway Steamer), by A. J. Jansen

History
- Name: SS Marylebone
- Operator: Great Central Railway
- Builder: Cammell Laird, Birkenhead
- Yard number: 673
- Launched: 21 April 1906
- Out of service: 1938
- Fate: Scrapped in Italy

General characteristics
- Tonnage: 2,074 gross register tons (GRT)
- Length: 270.2 feet (82.4 m)
- Beam: 41.1 feet (12.5 m)
- Depth: 20.3 feet (6.2 m)
- Installed power: 1300 nhp
- Propulsion: 3 Parsons steam turbines

SS Marylebone was a passenger and cargo vessel built for the Great Central Railway in 1906.

== History ==
The ship was built by Cammell Laird of Birkenhead and launched in 1906. She was one of an order for two ships, the other being Immingham. She undertook her trials in December 1906 and was reported of achieving a speed of 17.25 knots for 24 hours, and over 6 hours, a speed of 18.4 knots. She was built with accommodation for 60 first-class passengers in two-berth cabins, and 400 third-class passengers. She arrived in Grimsby on 6 January 1907 for her first voyage.

The Parsons steam turbines of Marylebone and Immingham were direct-drive units that proved uneconomic, and both vessels were soon rebuilt as single-screw steamships with the funnels of each being reduced from two to one.

In 1923 she passed to the London and North Eastern Railway and was sold in 1932 to the Tramp Shipping Development Company. She was renamed Velos, Arafat, and Velos again. She was scrapped in Italy in 1938.

== Depictions ==
Two notable paintings exist of the Marylebone, one by George Race as a triple-screw steamer, circa 1906, in the collection of the Grimsby Fishing Heritage Centre, and one by A.J. Jansen of the vessel in 1913, in the University of Hull Art Collection. The 1913 painting depicts the Marylebone after conversion to a single-screw steamer.
