= SS Oldham (1888) =

History
- Name: SS Oldham
- Operator: 1888–1897: Manchester, Sheffield and Lincolnshire Railway; 1897–1913: Great Central Railway
- Port of registry: (United Kingdom)
- Builder: Earle's Shipbuilding, Hull
- Launched: 1 November 1888
- Fate: Sold 1913, sunk 17 October 1941

General characteristics
- Tonnage: 846 gross register tons (GRT)
- Length: 240 feet (73 m)
- Beam: 30 feet (9.1 m)
- Depth: 14.6 feet (4.5 m)

SS Oldham was a passenger and cargo vessel built for the Manchester, Sheffield and Lincolnshire Railway in 1888.

== History ==
The ship was built by Earle's Shipbuilding in Hull and launched on 1 November 1888 by Miss Evelyn Button (aged 6). She was fitted with water ballast in a double bottom on the cellular system, and arranged with poop, bridge, and top-gallant forecastle. Accommodation was provided in the poop for forty first-class passengers, with dining saloon in polished hardwoods. The officers and engineers were berthed under the bridge, and the crew in the forecastle. She was also fitted with portable berths for emigrants. She was schooner rigged, and equipped with three steam winches and two steam cranes for handling cargo.

She was acquired by the Great Central Railway in 1897.

She was sold in 1913 to Greek owners and renamed Eleftheria.
