= SS Immingham =

Passenger and cargo vessel

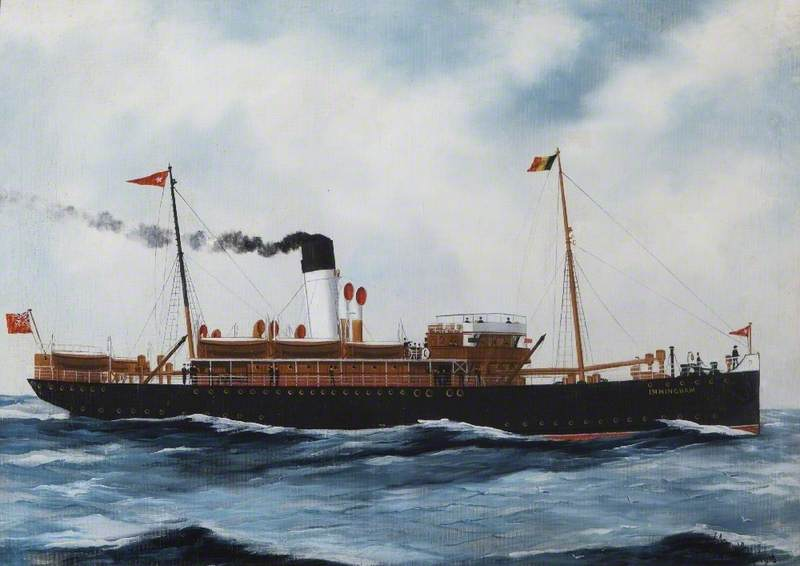
- The Immingham, by A. J. Jansen

History
- Name: 1906–1915: TrSS Immingham; 1915: HMS Immingham
- Operator: Great Central Railway
- Builder: Swan Hunter, Wallsend
- Yard number: 769
- Launched: 8 May 1906
- Fate: Sunk in collision 6 June 1915

General characteristics
- Tonnage: 2,009 gross register tons (GRT)
- Length: 271 feet (83 m)
- Beam: 41.2 feet (12.6 m)
- Depth: 20.4 feet (6.2 m)
- Installed power: 1300 nhp
- Propulsion: 3 Parsons steam turbines

TrSS Immingham was a passenger and cargo vessel built for the Great Central Railway in 1906.

== History ==
The ship was built by Swan Hunter of Wallsend and launched on 8 May 1906. She was one of an order for two ships, the other being Marylebone.

The Parsons steam turbines of Immingham and Marylebone were direct-drive units that proved uneconomic, and both vessels were soon rebuilt as single-screw steamships with the funnels of each reduced in number from two to one.

She was requisitioned in 1915 by the Admiralty for Royal Navy use as a stores carrier and renamed HMS Immingham. She sank on 6 June 1915 after a collision with the boom defence vessel HMS Reindeer in the Mediterranean Sea.

The Grimsby Fishing Heritage Centre has in its collection a painting by A.J. Jansen of Immingham as a single-screw steamer.
