= SS Sheffield (1877) =

History
- Name: 1877–1914: SS Sheffield; 1914–1919: SS Selda; 1919–1926: SS Sheffield; 1926–1931: SS Huseyniye; 1931–1961: SS Seyyar
- Operator: 1877–1897: Manchester, Sheffield and Lincolnshire Railway; 1897–1910: Great Central Railway; 1910–1911: Patriotic Steam Ship Company; 1911–1914: Joseph Constant, Grimsby; 1914–1919: Ottoman Navy; 1919–1926: Joseph Constant, Grimsby; 1926–1961: Various Turkish owners
- Port of registry: (United Kingdom)
- Builder: John Elder and Company, Govan
- Yard number: 212
- Launched: 13 January 1877
- Out of service: 1953
- Fate: Scrapped in 1961

General characteristics
- Tonnage: 644 gross register tons (GRT)
- Length: 201 feet (61 m)
- Beam: 27.1 feet (8.3 m)

SS Sheffield was a passenger and cargo vessel built for the Manchester, Sheffield and Lincolnshire Railway in 1877.

== History ==
The ship was built by John Elder and Company of Govan and launched on 13 January 1877. She was designed for the passenger and cargo service between Grimsby and Hamburg and Antwerp.

On 14 May 1893 she was badly damaged in a collision with the Londoner, and was only kept afloat by her watertight compartments. The Londoner sank but the crew of 36 and 90 passengers were rescued by the Sheffield. Two of the first-class passengers were in their bunks near the point at which the Londoner was struck, and were firmly wedged in by the broken timber and ironwork, and it was only with extreme difficulty that they were rescued. The Ashton also came to the scene, and the passengers were transferred for landing them at North Shields.

In 1897 she passed to the Great Central Railway. In 1910 she was sold to the Patriotic Steam Ship Company, and in 1911 to Joseph Constant in Grimsby. Finding herself in the Mediterranean Sea in 1914, she was seized by the Ottoman Navy for the duration of the First World War and renamed Selda. She was returned to her owners in 1919 and adopted her earlier name but instead of returning to Britain she was chartered to Greek operators. Sold in February 1924 to Persian owners and used in the next ramadan as a pilgrim carrier, still under the same name and British flag. In 1926 she was sold to owners in Turkey and was renamed Huseyniye in 1926 and Seyyar in 1931. She was withdrawn from service in 1953 and scrapped in 1961.
