= SS Northenden =

History
- Name: 1886–1910: SS Northenden; 1910–1911: SS Uhuvet; 1911–1912: SS Selâmet; 1912–1914: SS Ispahan; 1914–1919: SS Isfahan
- Operator: 1886–1897: Manchester, Sheffield and Lincolnshire Railway; 1897–1909: Great Central Railway; 1909–1910: Progress Company of West Hartlepool; 1910–1912: S Atychides and Th B Vahratoglu, Istanbul; 1912–1914: Cie Perso-Ottomane de Nav a Vapeur, Bandar Abbas; 1914: Levazim Isleri Dairesi, Turkey; 1914–1919: Government of Turkey
- Port of registry: (United Kingdom)
- Builder: Swan Hunter
- Yard number: 97
- Launched: 1 May 1886
- Out of service: 1919
- Fate: Scrapped 1919

General characteristics
- Tonnage: 840 gross register tons (GRT)
- Length: 230 feet (70 m)
- Beam: 30.1 feet (9.2 m)
- Depth: 14.6 feet (4.5 m)

SS Northenden was a passenger and cargo vessel built for the Manchester, Sheffield and Lincolnshire Railway in 1886.

== History ==
The ship was built by Swan Hunter and launched on 1 May 1886. She arrived for service in Grimsby on 9 June 1886. She was built for the passenger a freight trade between Grimsby and Hamburg. She was the second of an order of two ships from Swan Hunter, the other being Warrington. She was named after the town where the chairman of the company, Sir Edward Watkin, 1st Baronet resided.

In 1897 she was acquired by the Great Central Railway. She was sold in 1909 to the Progress Company of West Hartlepool. In 1910 they sold her to S Atychides & Th B Vahratoglu of Istanbul and she was renamed Uhuvet and then in 1911 renamed Selâmet. In 1912 she was sold to the Cie Perso-Ottomane de Nav a Vapeur in Bandar Abbas and renamed Ispahan. A new owner in 1914, Levazim Isleri Dairesi in Constantinople, renamed her Isfahan. She was requisitioned by the government of the Ottoman Empire on 3 November 1914 and sank on 15 August 1915 after being torpedoed by HMS E11. The Ottoman Navy refloated her on 17 October 1915, and she was beached. She was sold for breaking in 1919.
