= PS Cleethorpes =

History
- Name: 1903–1934: PS Cleethorpes; 1934–1935: PS Cruising Queen
- Operator: 1903–1923: Great Central Railway; 1923–1934: London and North Eastern Railway; 1934–1935: Redcliffe Shipping Company
- Port of registry: (United Kingdom)
- Builder: Gourlay Brothers, Dundee
- Yard number: 209
- Launched: 6 October 1903
- Out of service: 1934
- Fate: Scrapped 1935

General characteristics
- Tonnage: 302 gross register tons (GRT)
- Length: 190.1 feet (57.9 m)
- Beam: 25.5 feet (7.8 m)
- Depth: 7.9 feet (2.4 m)

PS Cleethorpes was a passenger and cargo vessel built for the Great Central Railway in 1903.

== History ==
The ship was built by Gourlay Brothers of Dundee and launched on 6 October 1903 by Miss Mills of Grimsby. She arrived in New Holland after a 24-hour voyage from Dundee on 21 November 1903. She was used on the New Holland to Hull ferry service.

In 1923 she transferred to the London and North Eastern Railway. She was sold in 1934 to the Redcliffe Shipping Company and renamed Cruising Queen. She was used on Firth of Forth pleasure cruises, but found unsuitable and scrapped in 1935.
