= Great Central Railway =

British pre-grouping railway company (1897–1922)

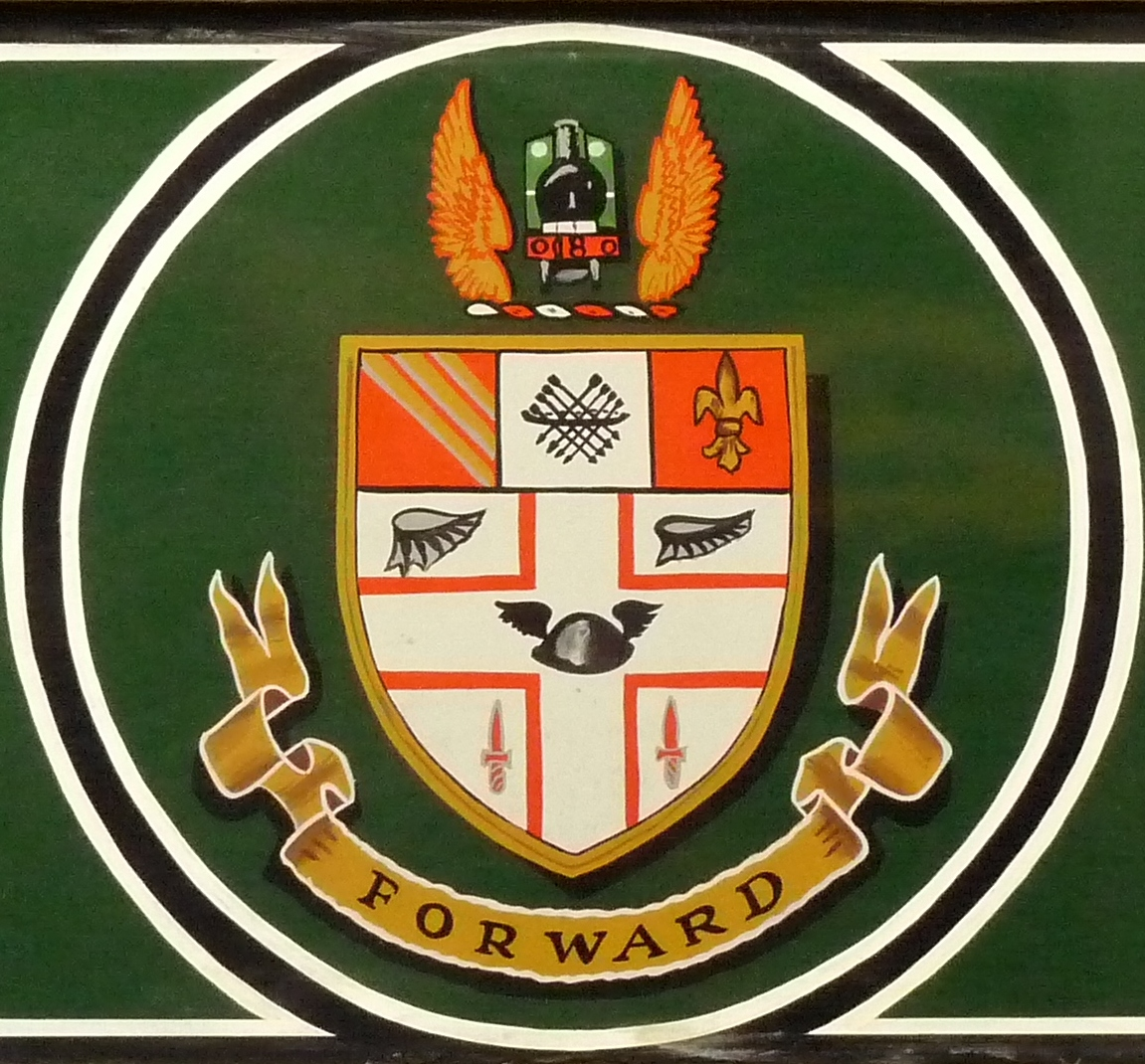

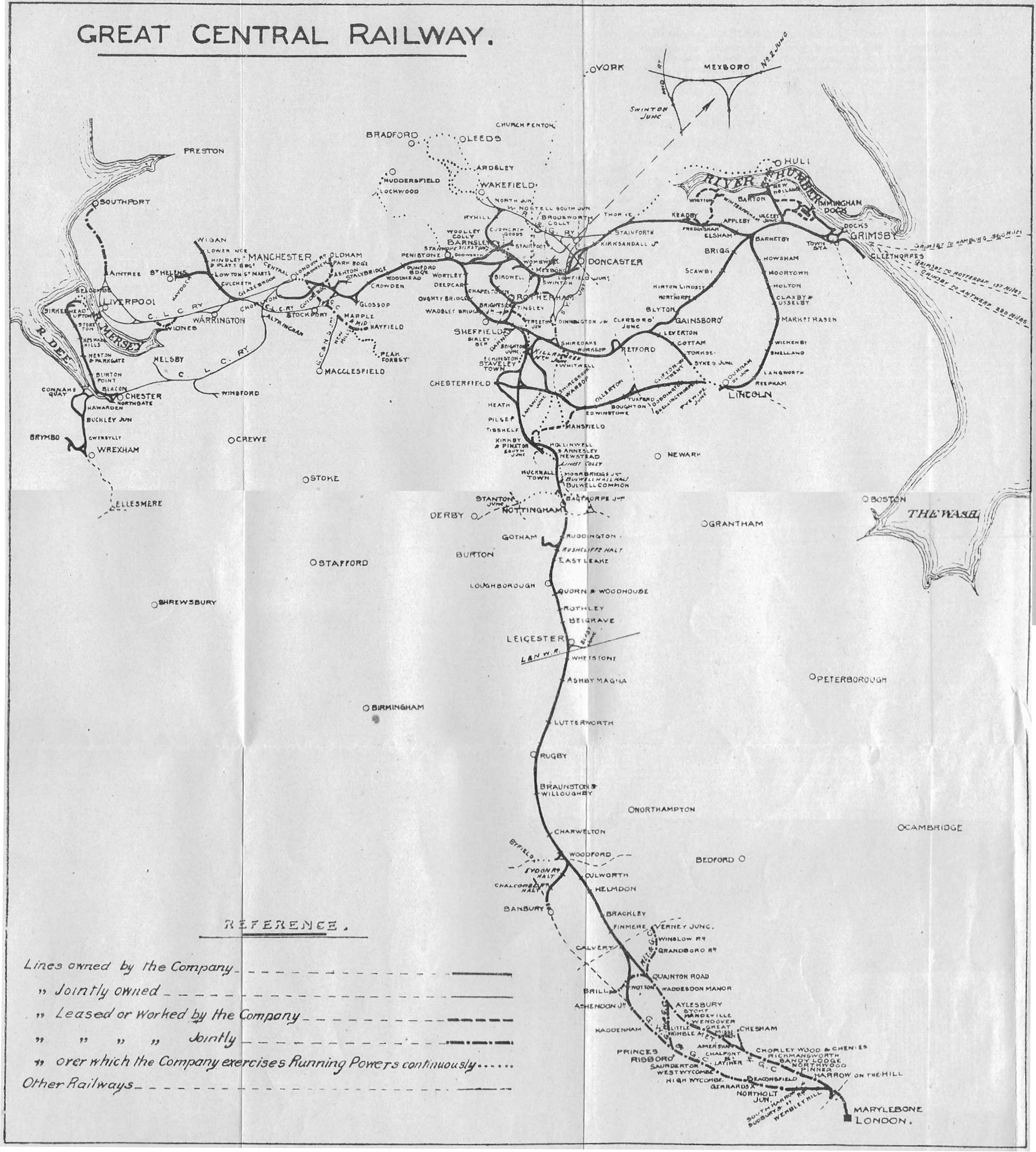
- 1920 map of the railway

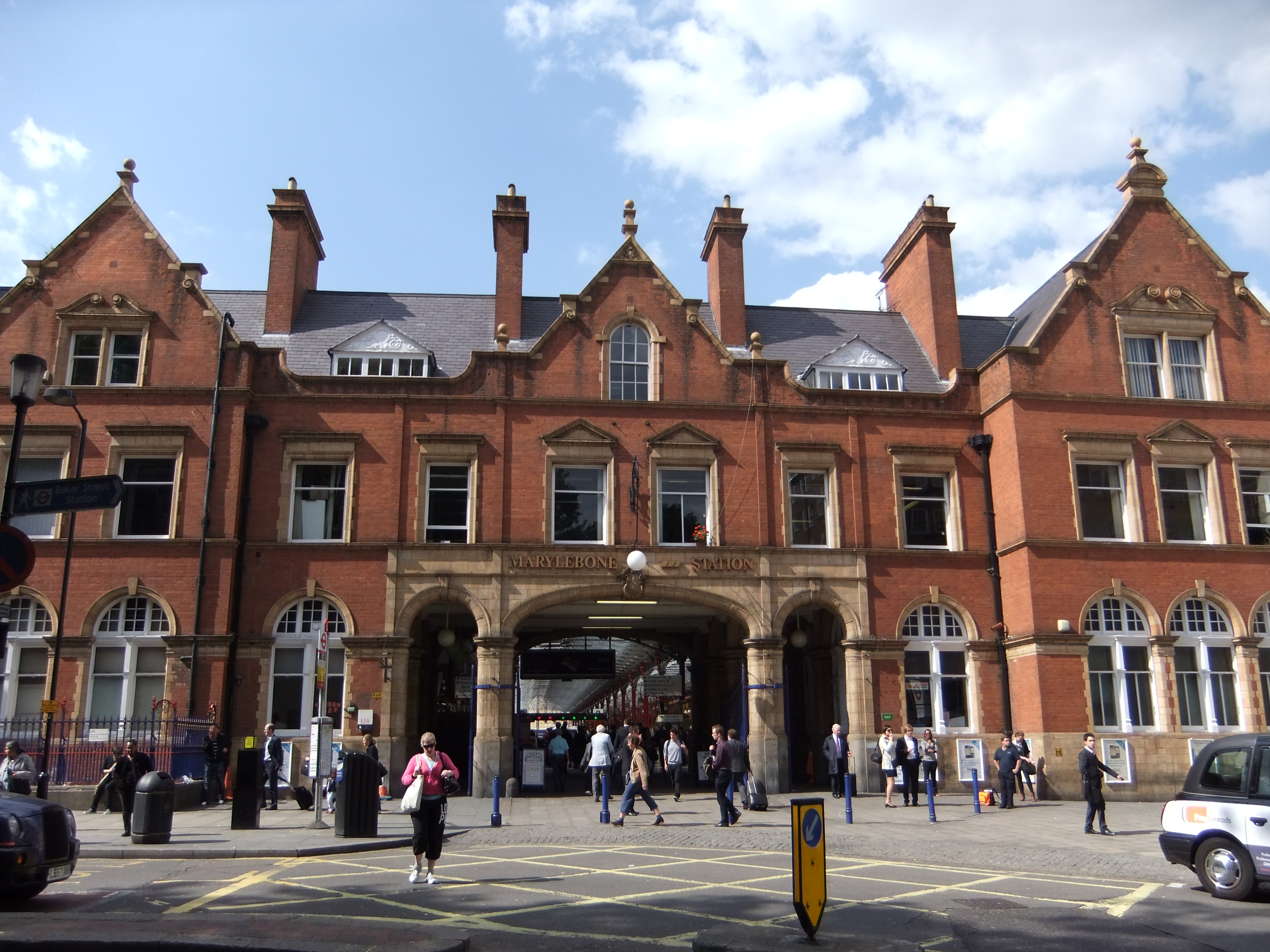
- Marylebone station. The London terminus of the Great Central Railway.

Overview
- Dates of operation: 1897–1922
- Predecessor: Manchester, Sheffield and Lincolnshire Railway
- Successor: London and North Eastern Railway

Technical
- Track gauge: 4 ft 8 1/2 in (1,435 mm) standard gauge
- Length: 852 miles 15 chains (1,371.5 km) (1919)
- Track length: 2,688 miles 40 chains (4,326.7 km) (1919)

The Great Central Railway in England was formed when the Manchester, Sheffield and Lincolnshire Railway changed its name in 1897, anticipating the opening in 1899 of its London Extension. On 1 January 1923, the company was grouped into the London and North Eastern Railway.

== History ==
=== New name ===
On assuming its new title, the Great Central Railway had a main line from Manchester London Road Station via Penistone, Sheffield Victoria, Brigg and Grimsby to Cleethorpes. A second line left the line at Penistone and served Barnsley, Doncaster and Scunthorpe, before rejoining the Grimsby line at Barnetby. Other lines linked Sheffield to Barnsley (via Chapeltown) and Doncaster (via Rotherham) and also Lincoln and Wrawby Junction. Branch lines in north Lincolnshire ran to Barton-upon-Humber and New Holland and served ironstone quarries in the Scunthorpe area. In the Manchester area, lines ran to Stalybridge and Glossop.

In the 1890s, the MS&LR began constructing its Derbyshire lines, the first part of its push southwards. Leaving its east–west main line at Woodhouse Junction, some 5½ miles south-east of Sheffield, the line headed towards Nottingham, a golden opportunity to tap into colliery traffic in the north of the county before reaching the city. A loop line was built to serve its station in Chesterfield.

==== Coat of arms ====
The Great Central Railway was the first railway granted a coat of arms. It was granted on 25 February 1898 by the Garter, Clarenceux and Norroy Kings of Arms as:

Argent on a cross gules voided of the field between two wings in chief sable and as many daggers erect, in base of the second, in the fesse point a morion winged of the third, on a chief also of the second a pale of the first thereon eight arrows saltirewise banded also of the third, between on the dexter side three bendlets enhanced and on the sinister a fleur de lis or. And for the Crest on a Wreath of the Colours A representation of the front of a locomotive engine between two wings Or as the same are in the margin hereof more plainly depicted to be borne and used for ever hereafter by the said Corporation of the Great Central Railway Company on seals, shields, banners or otherwise according to the Laws of Arms.

The design included elements representing Manchester (gules ... three bendlets enhanced ... or); Sheffield (eight arrows saltirewise banded); Lincoln (gules ... a fleur de lis or); Leicester (two wings); and London (Argent ... a cross gules ... daggers erect). Also represented was Mercury (a morion winged [sable]). It was used on locomotives and coaches.

The London and North Eastern Railway and the British Transport Commission, successors of the GCR, were granted arms of their own incorporating the GCR motto Forward.

The Great Central Railway (1976) Company Limited applied to the College of Arms as the successors to British Transport Commission (Loughborough to Birstall Light Railway) for permission to utilise the coat of arms of the GCR. A new design incorporating the same armorial components, updated in the modern style was proposed, but was rejected in favour of the original.

=== The "London extension" ===
Great Central Railway Act 1897
- Act of Parliament
- Parliament of the United Kingdom
- Long title: An Act to enable the Manchester Sheffield and Lincolnshire Railway Company to make new Railways to confer further powers upon that Company the Cheshire Lines Committee and the North Wales and Liverpool Railway Committee to make further provision with reference to a Joint Station at Nottingham with the Great Northern Railway Company to alter the name of the Company to provide for the conversion of the Company's Ordinary Stock and for other purposes.
- Citation: 60 & 61 Vict. c. liv

Dates
- Royal assent: 3 June 1897

Text of statute as originally enacted

The MS&LR obtained an act of Parliament, the Manchester, Sheffield and Lincolnshire Railway Act 1893 (56 & 57 Vict. c. lxxix), giving approval for its extension to London. On 1 August 1897, the railway's name was changed to Great Central Railway by the Great Central Railway Act 1897 (60 & 61 Vict. c. liv). Building work started in 1895, and the new line, 92 miles (147 km) in length, opened for coal traffic on 25 July 1898, for passenger traffic on 15 March 1899, and for goods traffic on 11 April 1899. It was designed for high-speed running throughout.

It is a commonly held myth that the nomenclature for the direction of travel on the new line was the opposite of standard UK railway practice, in that trains travelling to London were referred to as "down" trains, and those travelling away from the capital as "up" trains. It is supposed that it was a result of the GCR's headquarters at the time being in Manchester. The mileposts on the Great Central did start at zero at Manchester London Road and increase down the main line via Woodhead, Sheffield Victoria, Woodhouse, and then down the London Extension to Marylebone, 205 route miles from Manchester.

However, official documents dated 21 July 1898, detailing the method of working of mineral trains on the London Extension (used to help consolidate the new earthworks before passenger traffic began in March 1899), clearly show that the direction of travel on the new line was conventional – up to London, down to Annesley. Furthermore, contemporary descriptions in newspapers of the trains running on the new line are explicit that up trains ran to London and down trains away from it. That made the Great Central unusual amongst British railways in that its down trains went towards its "milepost zero" and up trains went away from it, but the convention of up and down trains in relation to London was retained.

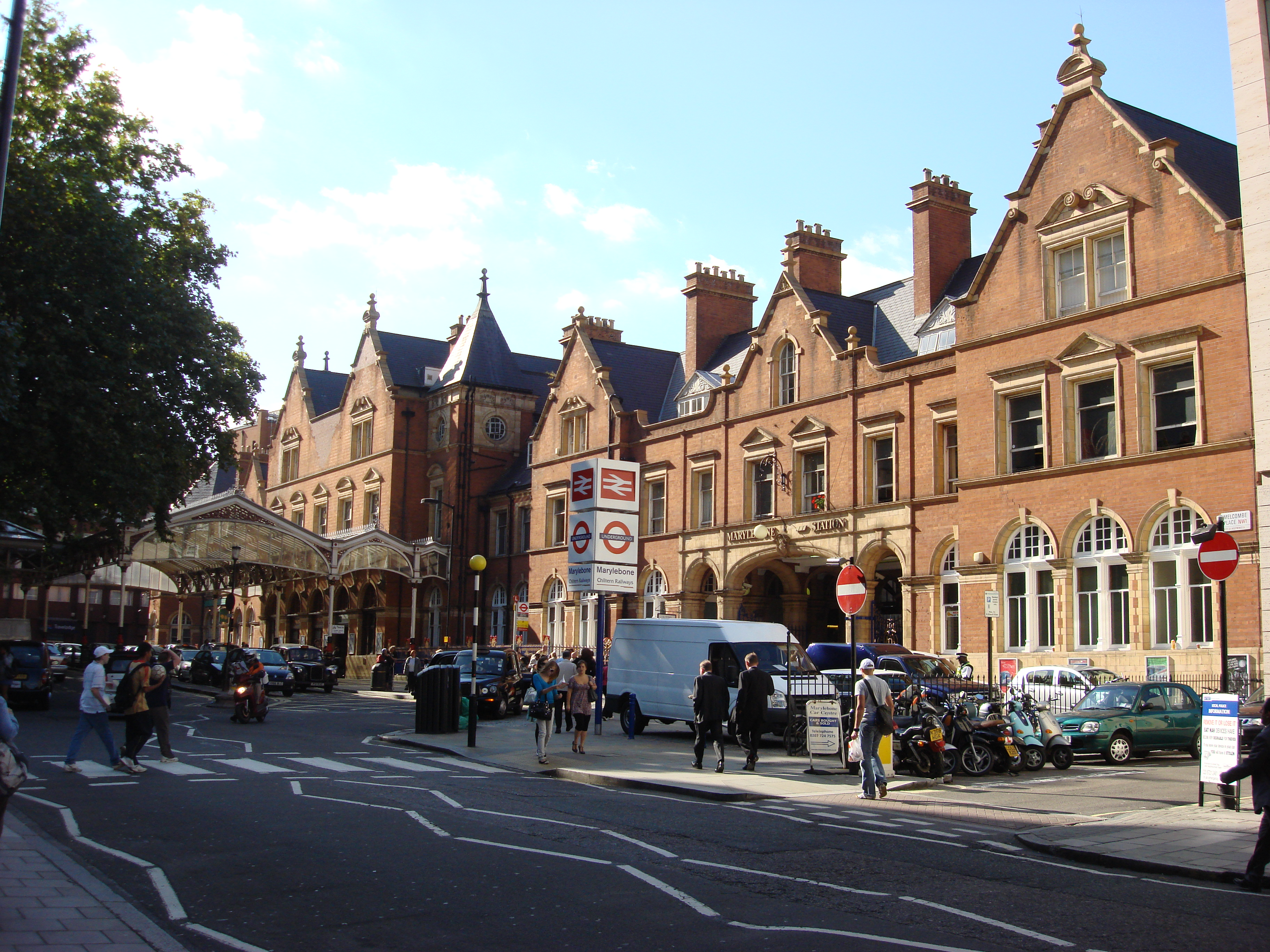
Marylebone station frontage

The new line was built from Annesley in Nottinghamshire to join the Metropolitan Railway (MetR) extension to Quainton Road, where the line became joint MetR/GCR owned (after 1903), and returned to GCR tracks at Canfield Place, near Finchley Road, for the final section to Marylebone. In 1903, new rails were laid parallel to the Metropolitan Railway from Harrow to the junction north of Finchley Road, enabling more traffic to use Marylebone.

=== Later history ===
In 1902, the company introduced an express service from Bournemouth and Southampton to York and Newcastle upon Tyne. A year later, it began a through running express from Dover and Folkestone to Leicester, Nottingham, Sheffield, Leeds, Huddersfield, Halifax, Bradford and Manchester, avoiding London and opening up the South Coast to the Midlands and the North. The route from Banbury to Reading was over Great Western track and from there it traversed South Eastern Railway track via Aldershot and Guildford to Redhill and on to Folkestone and Dover.

At the same time, the Great Central was gaining a reputation for fast services to and from London. In May 1903, the company promoted its services as Rapid Travel in Luxury, and Sheffield without a stop, adopted on 1 July 1903, became a trademark for the company, with 163.75 miles (263.53 km) run in three hours, an average of nearly 55 miles per hour (89 km/h). Slip coaches were provided for passengers for Leicester and Nottingham.

On 2 April 1906, an "alternative main line" route from Grendon Underwood Junction near Aylesbury to Neasden in north-west London opened. The line was joint GCR/GWR between Ashendon Junction and Northolt Junction. It was built to increase traffic on the GCR by overcoming capacity constraints on the Metropolitan extension and as a result of disagreements between the MetR and GCR after the resignation of Sir Edward Watkin due to poor health. By the time the line was built, the companies had settled their differences.

On 1 January 1923, under the terms of the Railways Act 1921, the GCR amalgamated with several other railways to create the London and North Eastern Railway.

The GCR line was the last complete mainline railway to be built in Britain until section one of High Speed 1 opened in 2003 and was also one of the shortest-lived intercity railway lines. Yet in its early years, its steam-hauled Sheffield expresses were the fastest in the country.

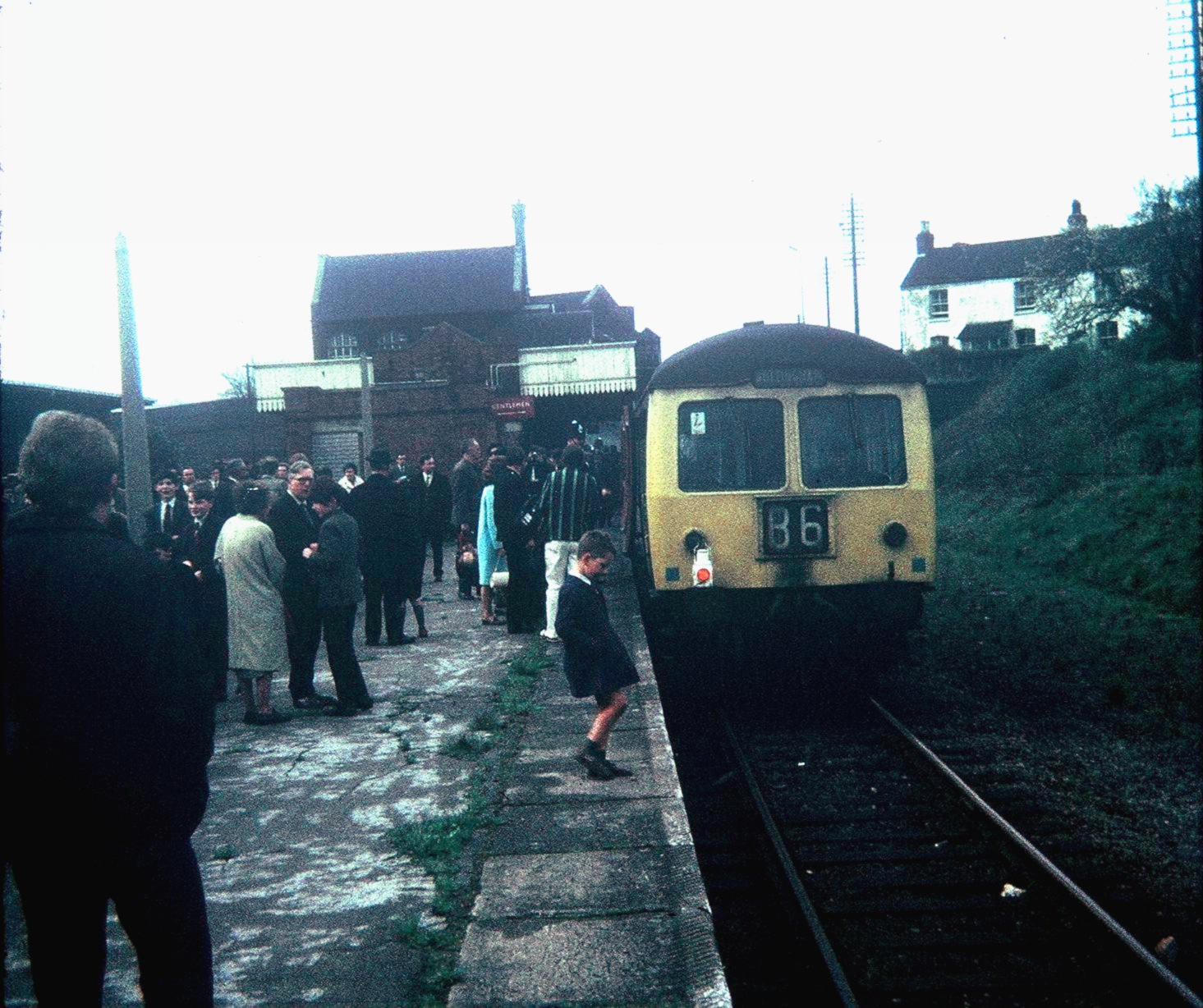
The last train at Rugby Central on 3 May 1969

== Closure ==
The express services from London to destinations beyond Nottingham were withdrawn in 1960. The line was closed to passenger trains between Aylesbury and Rugby on 3 September 1966. A diesel multiple-unit service ran between Rugby Central and Nottingham Arkwright Street until withdrawal on 3 May 1969.

=== Line retention ===
Since 1996, Chiltern Railways has used the Great Central lines south of Aylesbury for local services into London, including the alternative route south of Haddenham and widened lines south of Neasden for its intercity main line from Birmingham to London. In 2008, in a scheme partly funded by the Department for Transport, about three miles of line north of Aylesbury as far as Aylesbury Vale Parkway was brought back into passenger use. None of these lines are currently electrified.

Work started in 2019 on developing East West Rail, which will extend passenger services north of Aylesbury Vale Parkway through Quainton Road to meet a renewed Bicester Village to Bletchley section of the old 'Varsity Line' just beyond the site of the former Great Central station at Calvert. Services are expected to start in the mid-2020s.

== Acquisitions ==
- The Lancashire, Derbyshire and East Coast Railway (LD&ECR) opened in 1897, to link the coalfields with deep-water ports, and was intended to run from Sutton-on-Sea in Lincolnshire to Warrington in Lancashire. In the event only the section between Pyewipe Junction, near Lincoln and Chesterfield Market Place station and some branch lines were built. It was purchased by the GCR on 1 January 1907, to provide a better link between the London main line and the east coast.
- Wrexham, Mold and Connah's Quay Railway was purchased 1 January 1905.
- North Wales and Liverpool Railway was acquired at the same time.
- Wigan Junction Railway was bought on 1 January 1906, as was the Liverpool, St Helens and South Lancashire Railway
- North Lindsey Light Railway Scunthorpe to Whitton opened throughout on 1 December 1910 and was worked by the GCR. It carried passengers, although its main freight was ironstone.

== Joint working ==
Apart from the three branches in the Liverpool area, the GCR lines in the north of England were all east of Manchester but GCR trains could run from coast to coast by means of joint working with other railways. The largest of those utilized in this way were those under the Cheshire Lines Committee: the other participants were the Midland Railway and the Great Northern Railway, taking in both Liverpool and Southport. Other joint undertakings were (west to east):

- Manchester, South Junction and Altrincham Railway (GCR/LNWR)
- Oldham, Ashton and Guide Bridge Railway (GCR/LNWR)
- Macclesfield, Bollington and Marple Railway (GCR/NSR); including its Hayfield branch
- South Yorkshire Joint Railway (GCR, GNR, Lancashire and Yorkshire Railway, MR and North Eastern Railway)
- Sheffield District Railway(GCR and MidR)
- West Riding and Grimsby Joint Railway (GCR/GNR) - giving access to Wakefield and thence to Leeds
- Hull and Barnsley and Great Central Joint Railway - opened 1916 for freight traffic only.

There were also joint lines in the south:

- Aylesbury Station Joint Committee
- Great Western and Great Central Joint Railway
  - Banbury Junction Railway
- Metropolitan and Great Central Joint Railway
  - Watford Joint Railway

== Key officers ==
For those in position before 1899, dates are as served for the MS&LR.

=== General Managers ===
- 1886–1902 Sir William Pollitt (knighted 1899)
- 1902–1922 Sir Samuel Fay (knighted 1912)

=== Locomotive Engineer ===
- 1894–1900 Harry Pollitt
- 1900–1902 John George Robinson

=== Chief Mechanical Engineer ===
- 1902–1922 John George Robinson, for whom the post was created

== GCR locomotives ==
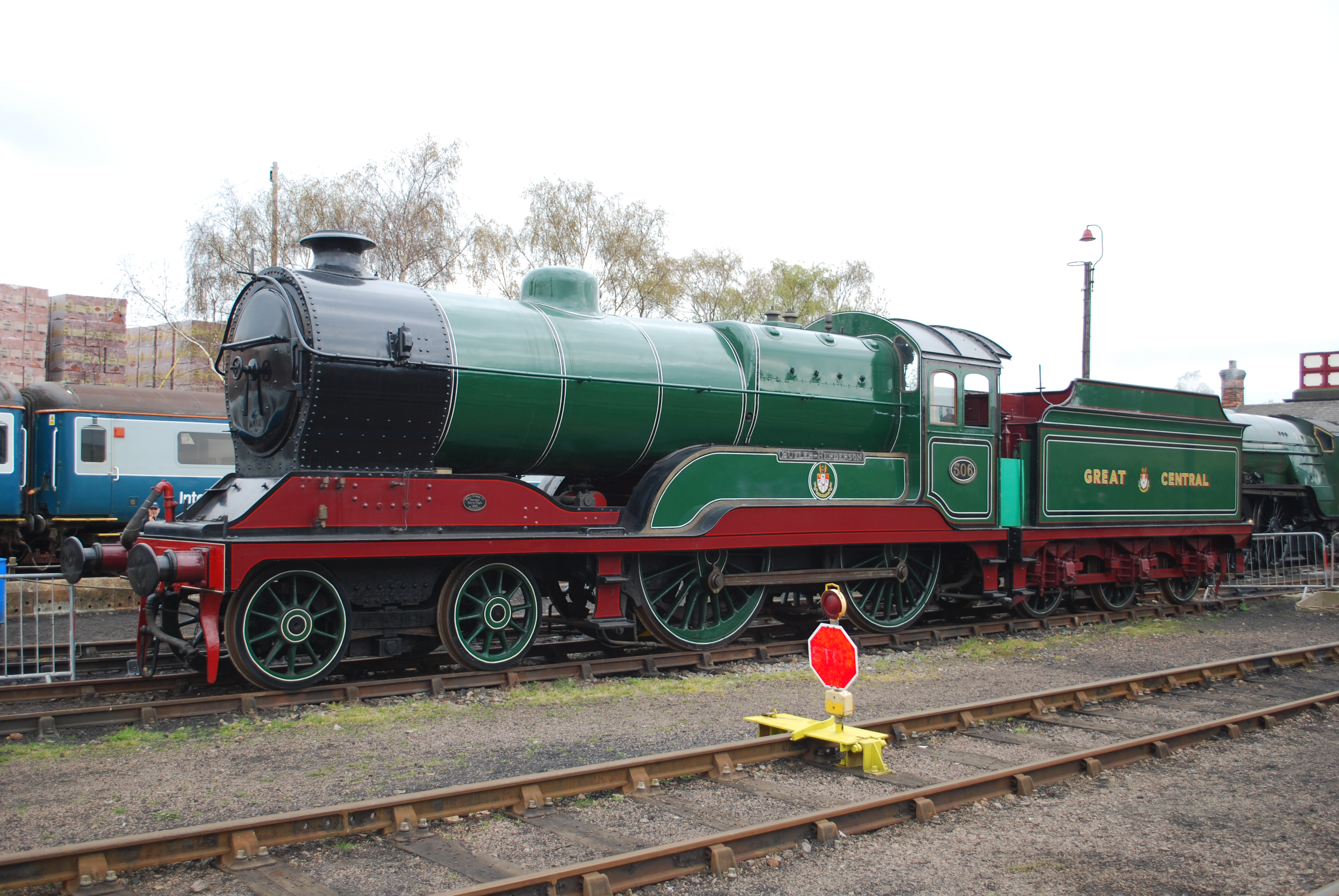
No. 506 Butler-Henderson, the sole surviving GCR Class 11F locomotive

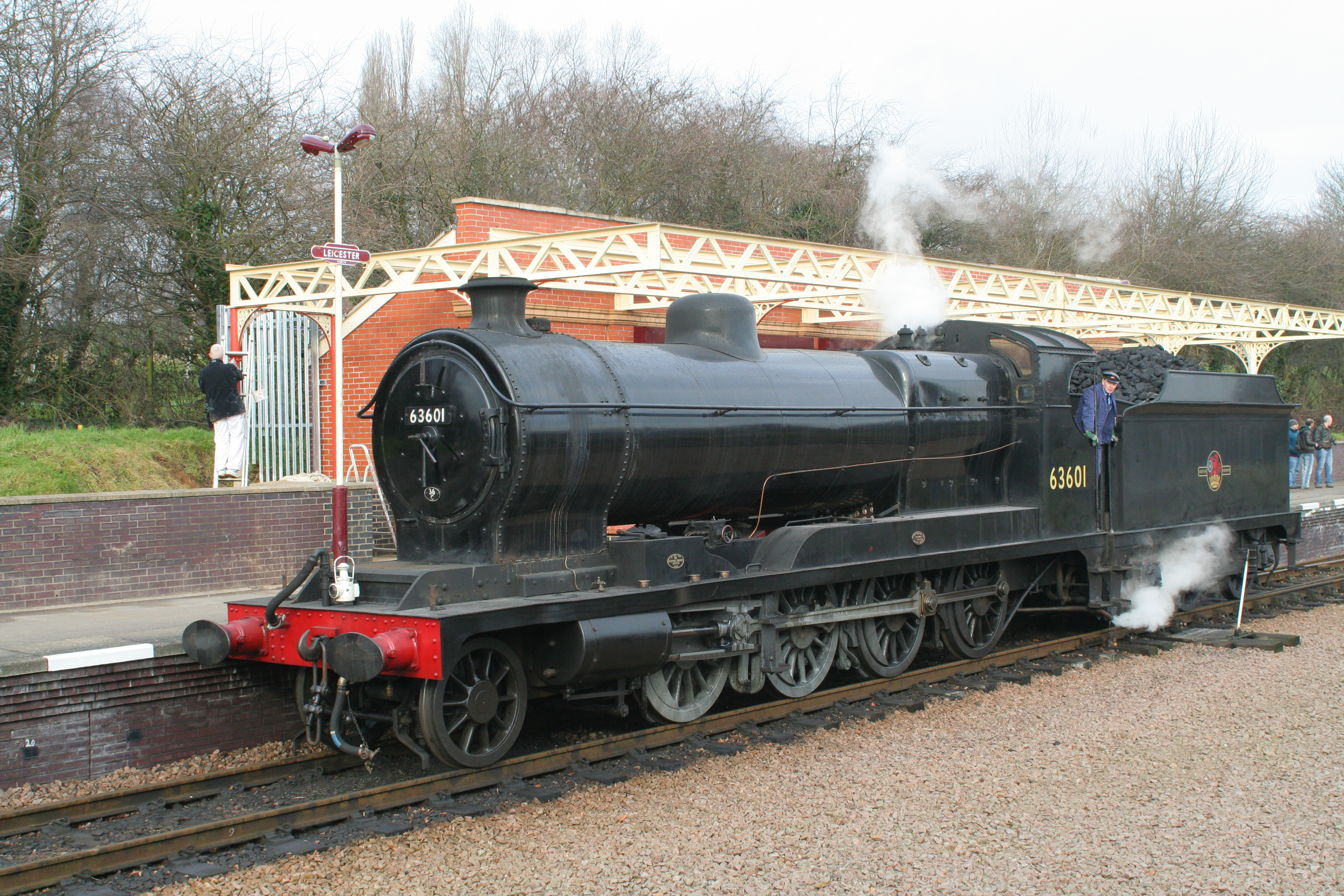
No. 63601, the sole surviving GCR Class 8K locomotive

These could generally be divided into those intended for passenger work, especially those used on the London Extension and those for the heavy freight work.

- See Locomotives of the Great Central Railway

=== Pollitt's locomotives ===
Taken over from the MS&LR, mainly of class F2, 2-4-2 tank locomotives, and also classes D5 and D6 4-4-0 locomotives.

=== Robinson locomotives ===
During Robinson's tenure, many of the larger express passenger engines came into being:

- Classes B1-B9: 4-6-0 tender locomotives
- Classes C4/5: 4-4-2 tender locomotives
- Classes D9-11: 4-4-0 tender locomotives
- Class J13: 0-6-0T
- Classes L1/L3: 2-6-4T
- Classes O4/5: 2-8-0, heavy freight locos, including ROD engines
- GCR Class 8A (LNER Class Q4) 0-8-0 heavy freight locomotive
- GCR Class 8H (LNER Class S1) 0-8-4T used at Wath marshalling yard

==== Preserved locomotives ====
Only two GCR locomotives are preserved:

Image	GCR No.	GCR Class	Type	Manufacturer	Serial No.	Date	Notes
	102	8K Class	2-8-0	GCR Gorton		January; 1912	At the Great Central Railway
	506	11F Class	4-4-0	GCR Gorton		January; 1920	On static display at Barrow Hill Roundhouse

In 2019 a project to build a replica of a GCR Class 2 4-4-0 (known as the LNER D7 Class) numbered 567, was started at Ruddington.

== Rolling stock ==
=== Coaching stock ===
The following GCR coaches are preserved.

Number & Name	Description	History & Current Status	Livery	Owner(s)	Date	Photograph
No. 946	MSLR six-wheel 5 compartment Third	Fully restored after a very long restoration. Usually on display in the Mountsorrel Museum.	GCR Chocolate and Cream	GCR Rolling Stock Trust	1888	~
No. 373	MSLR six-wheel Third	Awaiting extensive restoration, the body has been dismantled and flatpacked.	N/A	GCR Rolling Stock Trust	1889	~
No. 1076	6-wheel third	Built by MSLR for MSJAR. Operational, restored as an open saloon.	GCR chocolate & cream.	Buckinghamshire Railway Centre	1890	
No. 1663	Robinson Clerestory lavatory brake composite	Only the body survives though being the oldest surviving Great Central carriage this is unsurprising. The body is mounted on the underframe of an ex. LMS BG, which has now become its permanent rolling chassis.	N/A.	GCR Rolling Stock Trust.	1903	
No. 5~~	Robinson Suburban brake third	Body survives in good hands but it will require a new underframe and serious restoration work to return to service.	N/A.	GCR Rolling Stock Trust.	1905	
No. 793	Robinson Suburban third	At present the only Great Central coach on the south section. In store at Swithland Sidings with a cosmetically restored body, which should prevent further deterioration.	GCR chocolate & cream.	Great Central Railway Plc.	1905	~
No. 799	Robinson Suburban third	Awaiting major restoration which will require a lot of new bodywork to be manufactured.	N/A.	GCR Rolling Stock Trust.	1905	~
No. 228	'Barnum' open third	Undergoing restoration at Ruddington. It will be converted into a first class bar car in due course.	N/A.	GCR Rolling Stock Trust.	1910	
No. 664	'Barnum' open third	Will be restored when more accommodation has been built. It is intended to convert it into a dining car.	Varnished teak.	GCR Rolling Stock Trust.	1910	
No. 666	'Barnum' open third	Sheeted up as protection from the elements. It will be restored when more accommodation has been built and 664 has been completed. It is intended to convert it into a dining car.	N/A.	National Railway Museum.	1910	
No. 695	'Barnum' open brake third	Awaiting restoration, which is planned to incorporate a kitchen where the brake end used to be, so it will complement the rest of the Barnum set.	N/A.	GCR Rolling Stock Trust.	1911	
No. 652	Suburban Brake Third	Built in 1916. Arrived at Quainton in 1997. Restoration started while on display inside museum, doors are inside the carriage with GCR numbering and lettering.	N/A.	Buckinghamshire Railway Centre	1916	

=== Goods wagons and freight stock ===
Number	Type	Builder	Diagram and lot no.	Built	Location
	Single bolster	Birmingham, Metro-Cammell		1920	Shildon (available for transfer out of the collection 2020)

=== Cranes ===
Original company	Number	Type	Status/Notes	Location
M&GCJR	1	4-wheel Hand Crane	Built in 1914. Only M&GCJR-owned rail vehicle. Being restored. The original match wagon is not usable right now, so an LMS wagon underframe is in its place.	Buckinghamshire Railway Centre

== Major stations ==
- London Marylebone
- Manchester London Road
- Nottingham Victoria
- Sheffield Victoria
- Leicester Central
- Rugby Central

== Wath marshalling yard ==
The marshalling yard at Wath-upon-Dearne opened in November 1907. It was designed to cope with coal trains, full and empty; it was worked with electro-pneumatic signalling.

== Accidents and incidents ==
- On 30 March 1889, an excursion train was derailed at Penistone, Yorkshire due to a failure of an axle on the locomotive hauling it. A mail train ran into the wreckage at low speed. One person was killed and 61 were injured.
- On 17 November 1899, GCR goods guard, Charles Harry Bennion was stationed at Staveley Town Railway station, Derbyshire. At approximately 08.30 am his goods train from Staveley to Frodingham was working through the thick fog when it hit two ‘light engines’ due to a 'signalling error'. Charles’ injuries were fatal and he died instantly.
- On 23 December 1904, an express passenger train was derailed at Aylesbury, Buckinghamshire due to excessive speed on a curve. Another express passenger train ran into the wreckage at low speed. Four people were killed.
- On 2 February 1908, the driver of a freight train sneezed, his head collided with that of his fireman, knocking both of them out. Due to excessive speed, a van in the train derailed approaching Notton and Royston station, Yorkshire and the train overran signals there. It derailed completely at Ryhill.
- On 13 December 1911, a freight train ran away and was derailed at Wombwell Central station, Yorkshire. Both locomotive crew were killed.
- About 1913, a coal train was derailed at Torside, Derbyshire. The crew of the locomotive may have been overcome by fumes in the Woodhead Tunnel.

== Docks ==
=== Grimsby docks ===
Grimsby, dubbed the "largest fishing port in the world" in the early 20th century, owed its prosperity to the ownership by the GCR and its forebear, the MS&LR. Coal and timber were among its biggest cargoes. The port had two main docks: the Alexandra Dock (named for Queen Alexandra) and the Royal Dock which was completed in 1852, linked by the Union Dock. The total area of docks was 104.25 acres (42 ha).

=== Immingham Dock ===
Completed in 1912, this dock covered 71 acres (29 ha) and was mainly concerned with the movement of coal. On 22 July 2012, the docks held an open day to celebrate 100 years of operation.

=== Ships ===
The Great Central Railway operated a number of ships.

Ship	Launched	Tonnage (GRT)	Notes and references
SS Accrington	1910	1,629	Built in 1910 by Earle's Shipbuilding in Hull. Sold to Clayton and Davie Limited.
SS Ashton	1884	1,007	Built in 1884 by E. Withy and Company, Hartlepool for the Manchester, Sheffield and Lincolnshire Railway. Sold to Cadeby Steam Ship Company in 1916.
SS Barton	1891	123	A tug built in 1891 by Hepple and Company for the Manchester, Sheffield and Lincolnshire Railway. Based at Grimsby Docks. Scrapped in 1936.
SS Blackburn	1910	1,634	Built in 1910 by Earle's Shipbuilding in Hull. Sank in a collision with Rook off the Norfolk coast in December 1910.
PS Brocklesby	1912	508	Built by Earle's Shipbuilding in Hull for the New Holland to Hull ferry service. Sold in 1935 to the Redcliffe Shipping Company and renamed Highland Queen. Scrapped in 1936.
SS Bury	1911	1,634	Built in 1910 by Earle's Shipbuilding in Hull. Scrapped in 1958.
SS Chester	1884	1,010	Built in 1884 by E. Withy and Company, Hartlepool for the Manchester, Sheffield and Lincolnshire Railway. Sunk in the River Elbe in September 1910.
SS Chesterfield	1913	1,013	Built in 1913 by Swan Hunter. Lost in 1918.
PS Cleethorpes	1903	302	Built by Gourlay Brothers of Dundee for the New Holland to Hull ferry service. Sold around 1934 to the Redcliffe Shipping Company and renamed Cruising Queen. Scrapped shortly afterwards.
SS City of Bradford	1903	1,341	With City of Leeds, these were the first new ships ordered by the Great Central Railway. Built by Earle's Shipbuilding in Hull. Passed to the LNER in 1923 and Associated Humber Lines in 1935. but found to be surplus to requirements. Sold in 1936 to the Near East Shipping Co, London and renamed Hanne. The vessel was bombed and sunk off Malta in February 1942.
SS City of Leeds	1903	1,341	With City of Bradford, these were the first new ships ordered by the Great Central Railway. Built by Earle's Shipbuilding in Hull. Passed to the LNER in 1923 and Associated Humber Lines in 1935. Scrapped in 1937
SS Dewsbury	1910	1,631	Built in 1910 by Earle's Shipbuilding in Hull. Scrapped in 1959.
PS Grimsby	1888	351	Built in 1888 by Earle's Shipbuilding in Hull for the Manchester, Sheffield and Lincolnshire Railway. Commissioned for the New Holland to Hull ferry service. Scrapped in 1923.
SS Huddersfield	1872	221	Built in 1872 by J Elder of Fairfield. Wrecked in 1903.
SS Immingham	1906	2,009	Built in 1906 by Swan Hunter in Newcastle. Sunk on war service in 1916.
PS Killingholme	1912	508	Built by Earle's Shipbuilding in Hull for the New Holland to Hull ferry service. Withdrawn in 1934.
SS Leicester	1891	1,002	Built by Earle's Shipbuilding in Hull. A war loss in 1916.
SS Lincoln	1883	1,075	Built in 1883 by Earle's Shipbuilding in Hull for the Manchester, Sheffield and Lincolnshire Railway. Sold in 1914 to Greek owners and renamed Elikon. Sunk on 2 February 1917.
SS Lutterworth	1891	1,002	Built by Earle's Shipbuilding of Hull for the Manchester, Sheffield and Lincolnshire Railway. Entered service from Grimsby to Hamburg. Acquired by LNER in 1923. Served until 1932 when she sold to British and Irish Steam Packet Company and was scrapped the following year.
SS Macclesfield	1914	1,018	Built in 1914 by Swan Hunter. Transferred into Associated Humber Lines. Scrapped in 1958.
PS Manchester	1876	221	Built in 1876 by the Goole Engineering and Shipbuilding Company for the Humber Ferry Service. Scrapped in 1914.
SS Marple	1888	104	Built in 1888 by Earle's Shipbuilding in Hull for the Manchester, Sheffield and Lincolnshire Railway. Used as a tug and tender in Grimsby and Immingham. Transferred to the LNER in 1923. Sold to the Tees Towing Company in 1947.
SS Marylebone	1906	2,074	Built in 1906 by Cammell Laird, Birkenhead. Sold in 1932 to the Tramp Shipping Development Company. Renamed Velos, Arafat, and Velos. Scrapped in Italy in 1938.
SS Northenden	1886	843	Built in 1886 by Swan Hunter in Newcastle for the Manchester, Sheffield and Lincolnshire Railway. Sold to Progress Company of West Hartlepool in 1909.
SS Nottingham	1891	1,033	Built by Swan Hunter for the Manchester, Sheffield and Lincolnshire Railway. Entered service when delivered with her sisters Lutterworth and Staveley on the Grimsby - Hamburg route, but transferred to Grimsby - Rotterdam in 1897. The vessel served as a naval supply vessel between 1915 and 1918 and changed her name to HMS Notts. Following refurbishment in 1919 she re-entered commercial service returning to her original name of Nottingham. Acquired by LNER in 1923 and served until scrapped in 1935.
SS Oldham	1888	846	Launched in 1888 and delivered in 1889 by Earle's Shipbuilding of Hull for the Manchester, Sheffield and Lincolnshire Railway. Used for the Grimsby to Esbjerg service. Sold to Greek owners in 1913 and renamed Eleftheria.
SS Retford	1883	951	Built in 1883 by Earle's Shipbuilding in Hull for the Manchester, Sheffield and Lincolnshire Railway. Sold in 1910.
SS Sheffield	1877	644	Built in 1877 by J. Elder for the Manchester, Sheffield and Lincolnshire Railway. Sold in 1910 to Turkish owners and renamed Seyyar.
SS Staveley	1891	1,034	Built by Swan Hunter at Newcastle upon Tyne for the Manchester, Sheffield and Lincolnshire Railway. Entered service with her sisters Nottingham and Lutterworth on the Grimsby - Hamburg route. Acquired by LNER in 1923 and continued in service until sold to the British and Irish Steam Packet Company in 1932. She was scrapped a year later by Thos.W.Ward at Preston.
SS Stockport	1911	1,637	Built in 1910 by Earle's Shipbuilding in Hull. Sunk in February 1943.
SS Warrington	1886	840	Built in 1886 by Swan Hunter in Newcastle for the Manchester, Sheffield and Lincolnshire Railway. Ran aground on South Hasborough Sands in December 1903 and lost.
SS Wrexham	1902	1,414	Built in 1902 as Nord II, she was acquired by the Great Central Railway in 1905. Sunk on war service in 1919.

== Immingham museum ==
Immingham museum, which portrays the role of the Great Central Railway in the building of the docks and construction of the local rail network is home to the Great Central Railway Society archive. The museum is located in the Civic Centre, Pelham Road, Immingham and is open from 1pm to 4pm, Wednesday to Saturday from March through to November.

== See also ==
- Edward Chapman
