= LNER ships =

Ships operated by a British railway company

The London and North Eastern Railway (LNER) was a British railway company, one of the 'Big Four' formed in 1923 following the Railways Act 1921. Its operations included several ferry routes from ports on the east coast of England such as Harwich and Grimsby.

It inherited 17 ships from predecessor companies in 1923 and built 5 more before 1948 when it was nationalised under the Transport Act 1947 as part of British Railways.

== Vessels operated ==
Ship	Launched	Tonnage (GRT)	Notes and references
SS Accrington	1910	1,629	Built for the Great Central Railway and served on the Grimsby – Hamburg, Germany route. Acquired by LNER in 1923 and passed to Associated Humber Lines in 1934. From July 1942 used as a convoy rescue ship in the Second World War and completed 40 escort voyages. Returned to LNER post-war and in 1946, with her sister Dewsbury, was transferred to Harwich to replace war losses. Passed to British Railways in 1948. Served until scrapped in 1951 mainly on the Harwich – Antwerp route.
SS Amsterdam	1894	1,745	Built for the Great Eastern Railway. Served on the Harwich–Hook of Holland, Netherlands route until 1910 when she transferred to Harwich – Antwerp service. Acquired by LNER in 1923 and served until scrapped in 1928.
SS Amsterdam	1930	4,220	Built by John Brown and Company of Clydebank for use on the Harwich – Hook of Holland service. A sister of Vienna and Prague. Sold in 1941 to the Ministry of War Transport and converted to a troopship. In 1944, she struck a mine and sank off Normandy, France.
RMS Antwerp	1919	2,957	Built for the Great Eastern Railway. Acquired by LNER in 1923 and operated on the Harwich – Antwerp service. The vessel was returned to the LNER in 1945 and fitted out as a troopship. Passed to British Railways in 1948 and served until scrapped in 1951 carrying troops between Harwich and Hook of Holland.
SS Archangel	1910	2,570	Built as St. Petersburg for the Great Eastern Railway. Renamed Archangel in 1916 and acquired by LNER in 1923. Bombed and sunk on 16 May 1941 off the East coast of Scotland.
SS Arnhem	1946	4,891	Built by John Brown and Company at Clydebank for use on the Harwich – Hook of Holland route. She was the company's first oil burner. Passed to British Railways in 1948 and served on the Hook of Holland route with her near sister Amsterdam [of 1950] until withdrawn in April 1968. Attempts to sell the vessel failed and she was scrapped in 1969.
SS City of Bradford	1903	1,340	Built by Earle's Shipbuilding for the Great Central Railway. Made her maiden voyage to Rotterdam before transferring to Scandinavian routes, eventually taking up service on the Grimsby – Hamburg route for which she was designed. In 1914 on passage to Hamburg and being unaware of the outbreak of war, she was intercepted off Heligoland and taken as a prize. Renamed Donau she was recovered by British forces in January 1919 and returned to Grimsby. Acquired by LNER in 1923, she was transferred to Associated Humber Lines in 1935 but found to be surplus to requirements. Sold in 1936 to the Near East Shipping Co, London and renamed Hanne. The vessel was bombed and sunk off Malta in February 1942.
SS City of Leeds	1903	1,341	Built by Earle's Shipbuilding for the Great Central Railway. A sister of City of Bradford, for service on the Grimsby – Hamburg route. Was in Hamburg when war broke out in 1914 and was taken as a 'seized prize'. She was recovered in early 1919 and towed to Grimsby, where she was refurbished entering service to Rotterdam pending resumption of the Hamburg service. Acquired by LNER in 1923, and with her sister was transferred to Associated Humber Lines in 1935 but was also found to be surplus to requirements. The vessel was sold and scrapped in 1936 at Blyth, Northumberland.
SS Dewsbury	1910	1,631	Built for the Great Central Railway for service on the Grimsby–Hamburg route. The first vessel in a series of five sister ships which were all built by Earle's Shipbuilding at Hull. Acquired by LNER in 1923. Passed to Associated Humber Lines in 1934 and was converted to a Convoy Escort Vessel in the war. She returned to service post-war in late 1945 on the Harwich – Antwerp route with sister vessel Accrington replacing tonnage lost in the war by the Harwich fleet. Passed to British Railways in 1948 she was finally withdrawn from service in January 1959 and was scrapped in May of that year.
SS Lutterworth	1891	1,002	Built by Earle's Shipbuilding of Hull, a sister of the Nottingham,Staveley and Leicester, for the Manchester, Sheffield and Lincolnshire Railway, who later became the Great Central Railway in 1897. Entered service from Grimsby to Hamburg. Acquired by LNER in 1923. Served until 1932 when she sold to British and Irish Steam Packet Company and was scrapped the following year.
SS Macclesfield	1914	1,018	Built by Swan Hunter at Newcastle upon Tyne for the Great Central Railway. Remained in commercial service in the war mainly serving the Netherlands. Resumed Grimsby – Antwerp service in 1919 and acquired by LNER in 1923. Transferred to Associated Humber Lines in 1935. Resumed service in 1945 between Goole or Hull to Antwerp or Rotterdam. Passed to British Railways in 1948 and served until scrapped in 1958.
SS Malines	1921	2,969	Built for the Great Eastern Railway by Armstrong Whitworth at Newcastle, for service on the Harwich – Antwerp route. Acquired by LNER in 1923 but was torpedoed and sunk off Port Said in 1942. Having been raised and towed back in 1945 to her builders, the level of engine damage led to her being laid up and she was eventually scrapped in 1948.
SS Nottingham	1891	1,033	Built by Swan Hunter for the Manchester, Sheffield and Lincolnshire Railway who later became the Great Central Railway in 1897. Entered service when delivered with her sisters Lutterworth and Staveley on the Grimsby – Hamburg route, but transferred to Grimsby – Rotterdam in 1897. The vessel served as a naval supply vessel between 1915 and 1918 and changed her name to HMS Notts. Following refurbishment in 1919 she re-entered commercial service returning to her original name of Nottingham. Acquired by LNER in 1923 and served until scrapped in 1935.
SS Prague	1929	4,220	Built by John Brown and Company at Clydebank, a sister of Vienna and Amsterdam, for use on the Harwich – Hook of Holland route. Sold in 1941 to the Ministry of War Transport and converted to a troopship. Returned to LNER in 1945 and re-opened the Hook of Holland service but in a spartan condition and without her running mates; the Amsterdam was a war loss and the Vienna retained as a troopship by the Ministry of War Transport. Upon arrival of the new-built Arnhem in 1947, she was sent for an overdue refurbishment but was gutted by fire and sank whilst at the shipyard. She was raised and towed to Barrow in September 1947 where she was broken up.
SS Roulers	1894	1,753	Built by Earle's Shipbuilding in Hull as Vienna for the Great Eastern Railway, and entered service with her sisters Amsterdam and Berlin on the Harwich – Hook of Holland route. Renamed Roulers in 1920. Acquired by LNER in 1923 and served on the Harwich–Zeebrugge route until withdrawn and scrapped in 1930.
SS Staveley	1891	1,034	Built by Swan Hunter at Newcastle upon Tyne for the Manchester, Sheffield and Lincolnshire Railway which became the Great Central Railway in 1897. Entered service with her sisters Nottingham and Lutterworth on the Grimsby – Hamburg route. Acquired by LNER in 1923 and continued in service until sold to the British and Irish Steam Packet Company in 1932. She was scrapped a year later by Thos.W.Ward at Preston.
SS St Denis	1908	2,570	Built by John Brown and Company at Clydebank as Munich for the Great Eastern Railway for service on the Harwich – Hook of Holland route. Requisitioned in the First World War for use as a hospital ship and renamed St Denis. Acquired by LNER in 1923 and continued to serve the Hook of Holland route until 1932 when she was relegated to summer secondary services by new buildings on the Hook route. She was employed in evacuation duties at Amsterdam in 1940 when she became trapped and was scuttled. Salvaged by the Germans and served until scrapped in 1950, having been renamed twice as Skorpion and Barbara in the interim.
MV Suffolk Ferry	1947	3,138	Built by John Brown and Company at Clydebank. Passed to British Railways in 1948, withdrawn 1980 and scrapped in 1981.
SS Train Ferry No. 1	1917	2,683	Built by Armstrong Whitworth in Newcastle upon Tyne for use between Richborough, Kent and Dunkirk, France. Laid up post-war. Acquired by LNER in 1923 and in April 1924 opened the Harwich–Zeebrugge, Belgium train ferry route with her sister vessels. Requisitioned in 1940 by the Royal Navy and renamed HMS Princess Iris and converted in 1941 to a Landing Craft carrier. Returned to LNER in 1946 and renamed SS Essex Ferry. Following refurbishment at John Brown and Company at Clydebank, she re-opened the Harwich – Zeebrugge service. Passed to British Railways in 1948 she was renamed SS Essex Ferry II in 1957, when they took delivery of a new train ferry of the same name. She was withdrawn from service and scrapped at Grays, Essex in that year.
SS Train Ferry No. 2	1917	2,678	Built by Armstrong Whitworth at Newcastle upon Tyne for use between Richborough, and Dunkirk. Laid up post-war. Acquired by LNER in 1923 and in 1924 opened the Harwich –Zeebrugge train ferry service with her two sisters. Requisitioned in 1940 by the Royal Navy she was lost on 13 June 1940 off Saint-Valery-en-Caux, Seine Maritime, France.
SS Train Ferry No. 3	1917	2,672	Built by Fairfields of Glasgow for use between Richborough, and Dunkirk. Laid up post-war. Acquired by LNER in 1923 and opened the Harwich – Zeebrugge train ferry route in 1924. Requisitioned in 1940 by the Royal Navy. Renamed HMS Daffodil and converted in 1941 to a Landing Craft carrier. Lost off Dieppe, Seine-Maritime, on 18 March 1945.
SS Vienna	1929	4,227	Built by John Brown and Company at Clydebank for the Harwich – Hook of Holland route, the first of three sister vessels. In 1932 she had modifications carried out including an extension to her promenade deck and inaugurated a programme of short summer cruises to the near continent which were to become very successful and which continued until 1939. In this pre-war period she was considered the pride of the Harwich fleet. Sold in 1941 to the Ministry of War Transport and converted to a troopship. Post-war the vessel operated under LNER/BR management as a leave ship for the British Army of the Rhine with services from Harwich – Hook of Holland and Tilbury – Ostend. She was based at Harwich in that period where she suffered an engine room explosion in February 1952 which killed two crew members. She was withdrawn from service in June 1960 and scrapped later that year in Belgium.

== Sources ==
- Haws, Duncan (1993). Britain's Railway Steamers – Eastern and North Western Companies + Zeeland and Stena. Merchant Fleets. Vol. 25. Hereford: TCL Publications. ISBN 978-0-946378-22-7.
