= SS Vienna (1894) =

UK North Sea ferry, converted into an armed boarding steamer

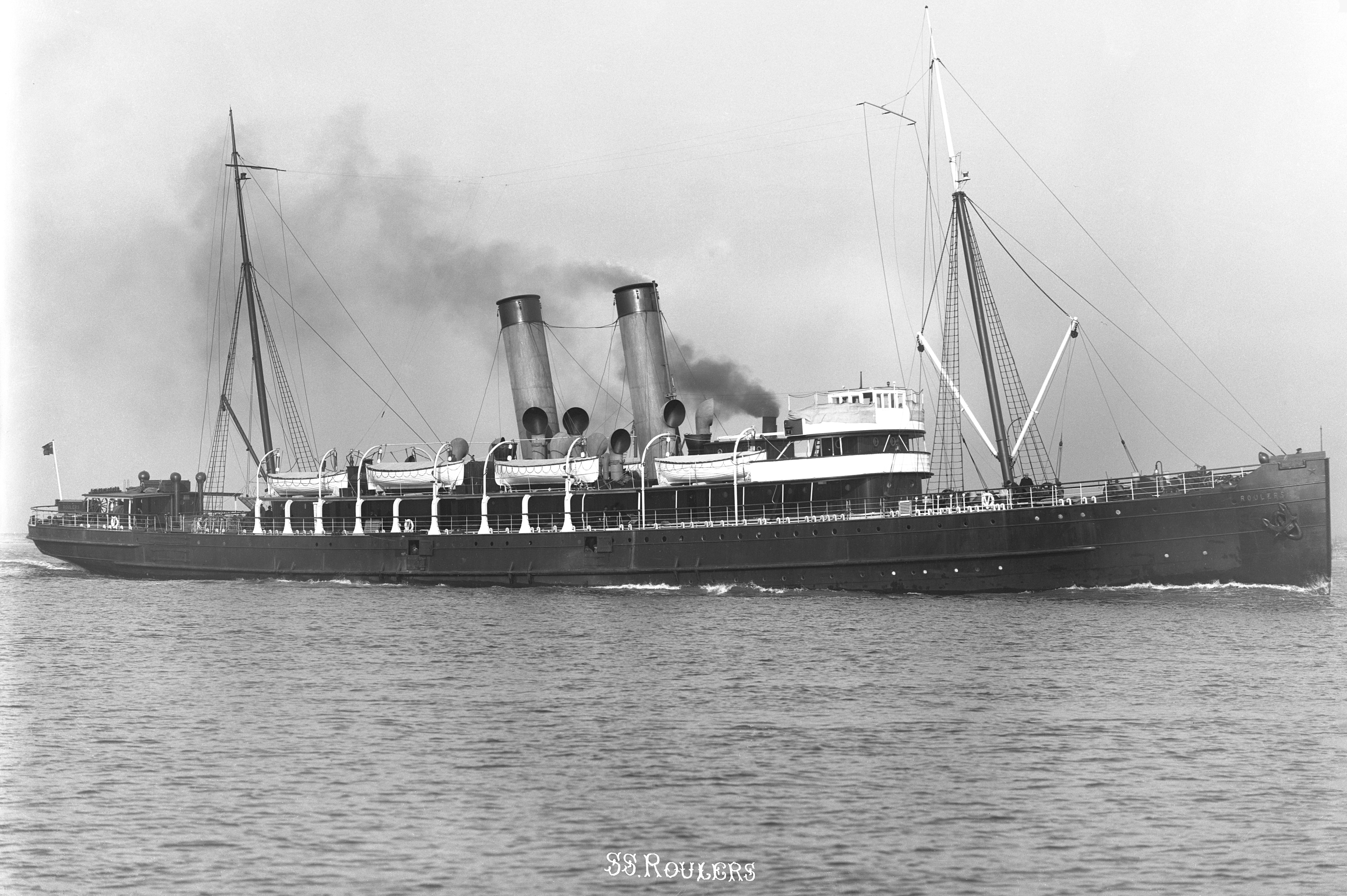
- Roulers in the 1920s

History

United Kingdom
- Name: 1894: Vienna; 1915: Antwerp; 1915: HMS Vienna; 1920: Roulers
- Namesake: 1894: Vienna; 1915: Antwerp; 1920: French for Roeselare
- Owner: 1894: Great Eastern Railway; 1923: LNER
- Operator: 1915: (United Kingdom) Royal Navy
- Port of registry: (United Kingdom) Harwich
- Route: 1894: Harwich – Hook of Holland; 1910: Harwich – Antwerp; 1920: Harwich – Zeebrugge
- Builder: Earle's Shipbuilding, Hull
- Yard number: 387
- Launched: 18 July 1894
- Completed: October 1894
- Commissioned: into Royal Navy, January 1915
- Decommissioned: from Royal Navy, August 1919
- Identification: UK official number 99457; code letters NMRV; by 1913: call sign PQV
- Fate: scrapped, 1930

General characteristics
- Type: North Sea ferry
- Tonnage: 1,753 GRT, 550 NRT
- Length: 302.4 ft (92.2 m)
- Beam: 36.0 ft (11.0 m)
- Depth: 16.2 ft (4.9 m)
- Decks: 2
- Installed power: 2 × triple-expansion engines; 447 NHP
- Propulsion: 2 × screws
- Speed: 18 knots (33 km/h)
- Capacity: Passengers: 218 × 1st class; 120 × 2nd class
- Sensors & processing systems: submarine signalling
- Notes: sister ships: Berlin, Amsterdam

SS Vienna was a UK North Sea ferry. She was built in England in 1894 for the Great Eastern Railway (GER). In the First World War she was at first an accommodation ship, then the Q-ship Antwerp, and finally the armed boarding steamer HMS Vienna. She was returned to the GER in 1919, and renamed Roulers in 1920. In the railway grouping of 1923 she became part of the London and North Eastern Railway (LNER) fleet. She was scrapped in England in 1930.

She was the first of two railway-owned Harwich-based ferries to be named after the Austrian capital Vienna. The second Vienna was built in 1929, and scrapped in 1960.

== Building ==
In 1894, Earle's Shipbuilding of Kingston upon Hull built three sister ships for the GER. Yard number 379 was launched on 10 January as Berlin. Yard number 380 was launched on 24 January as Amsterdam. Yard number 387 was launched on 18 July by Lady Seager Hunt, wife of Sir Frederick Seager Hunt, Bart, Chairman of Earle's Shipbuilding, as Vienna. The ship was completed that October.

Vienna's registered length was 302.4 ft (92.2 m), her beam was 36.0 ft (11.0 m), and her depth was 16.2 ft (4.9 m). For overnight crossings of the North Sea she had berths for 338 passengers: 218 in first class, and 120 in second class. Her tonnages were 1,753 GRT and 550 NRT. She had twin screws, each driven by a three-cylinder triple-expansion engine. The combined power of her twin engines was rated at 447 NHP, and gave her a speed of 18 knots (33 km/h).

== Career ==
The GER registered Vienna at Harwich. Her UK official number was 99457, and her code letters were NMRV. She entered service on the GER's route linking Harwich and the Hook of Holland. The Postmaster General awarded her a mail contract in 1898.

In 1910, the GER transferred Vienna to its route linking Harwich and Antwerp. By 1911, she was equipped with submarine signalling and wireless telegraphy. By 1913, her wireless call sign was PQV.

After the First World War began in August 1914, Vienna was used as an accommodation ship. Then, in January 1915, the Admiralty requisitioned her, and had her converted into the Q-ship Antwerp, designed to lure enemy U-boats. In April 1915 she was converted into an armed boarding steamer, and commissioned as HMS Vienna. She was not returned to her owners until August 1919, about nine months after the Armistice.

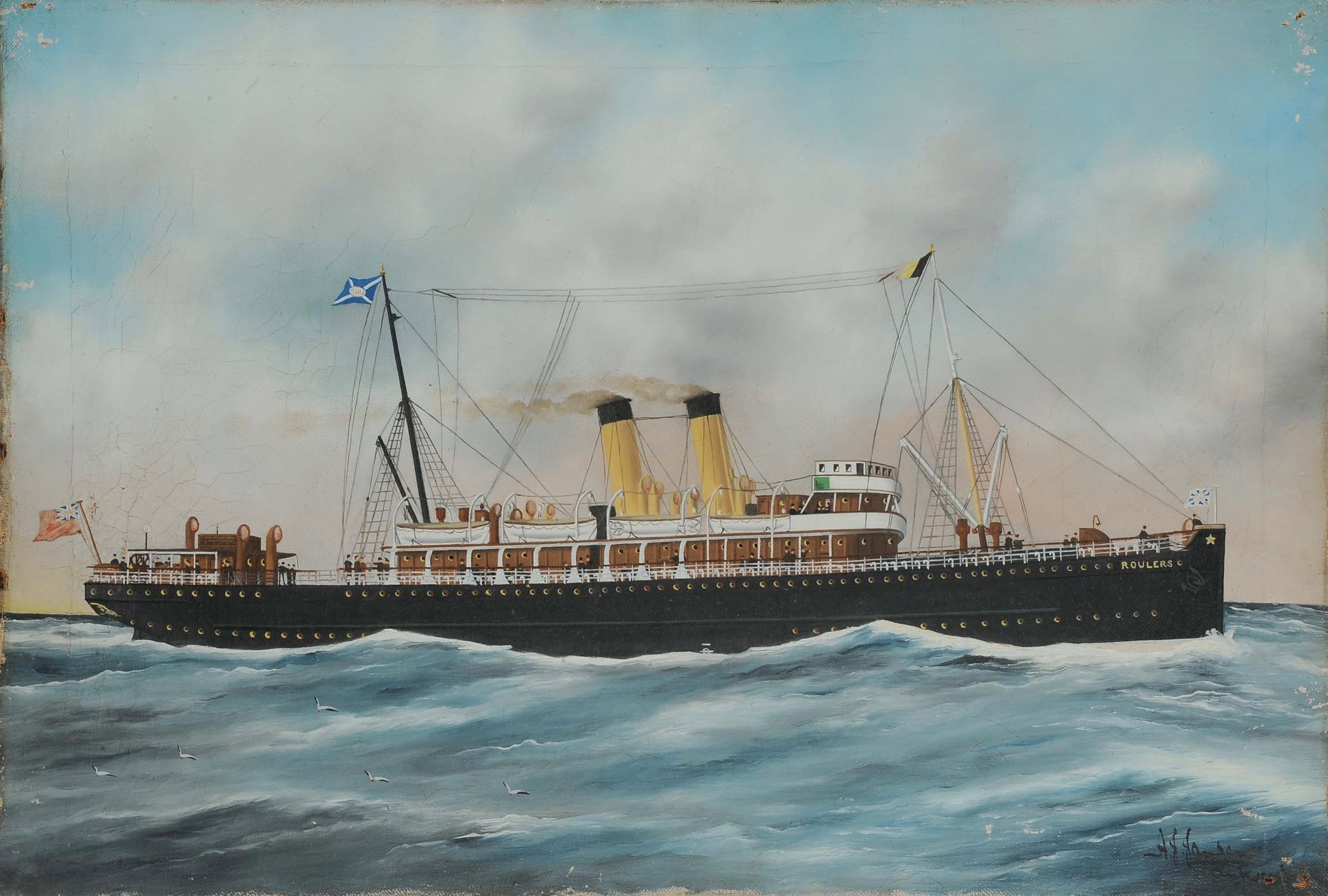
Roulers, painted by Harry J Jansen

In 1920, the GER renamed the ship Roulers, which is the French name for the Flemish town of Roeselare in West Flanders. The GER transferred her to its route linking Harwich with Zeebrugge. In 1923, the GER became part of the new LNER, and Roulers became part of the LNER's shipping fleet.

In 1930, Roulers was scrapped at Blyth, Northumberland.

== Bibliography ==
- Duckworth, Christian Leslie Dyce; Langmuir, Graham Easton (1968). Railway and other Steamers. Prescot: T. Stephenson and Sons. ISBN 978-0901314123.
- Haws, Duncan (1993). Britain's Railway Steamers – Eastern and North Western Companies + Zeeland and Stena. Merchant Fleets in Profile. Vol. 25. Hereford: TCL Publications. ISBN 0-946378-22-3.
- Lloyd's Register of British and Foreign Shipping. Vol. I.–Steamers. London: Lloyd's Register of Shipping. 1896 – via Internet Archive.
- Lloyd's Register of British and Foreign Shipping. Vol. II.–Steamers. London: Lloyd's Register of Shipping. 1911 – via Internet Archive.
- Lloyd's Register of Shipping. Vol. II.–Steamers. London: Lloyd's Register of Shipping. 1920 – via Internet Archive.
- Lloyd's Register of Shipping. Vol. II.–Steamers and Motor Vessels. London: Lloyd's Register of Shipping. 1923 – via Internet Archive.
- The Marconi Press Agency Ltd (1913). The Year Book of Wireless Telegraphy and Telephony. London: The St Katherine Press.
- Mercantile Navy List. London: Registrar General of Shipping and Seamen. 1895 – via Crew List Index Project.
