= Richborough =

Harbour in Kent, England

Coordinates: 51.2965°N 1.3192°E

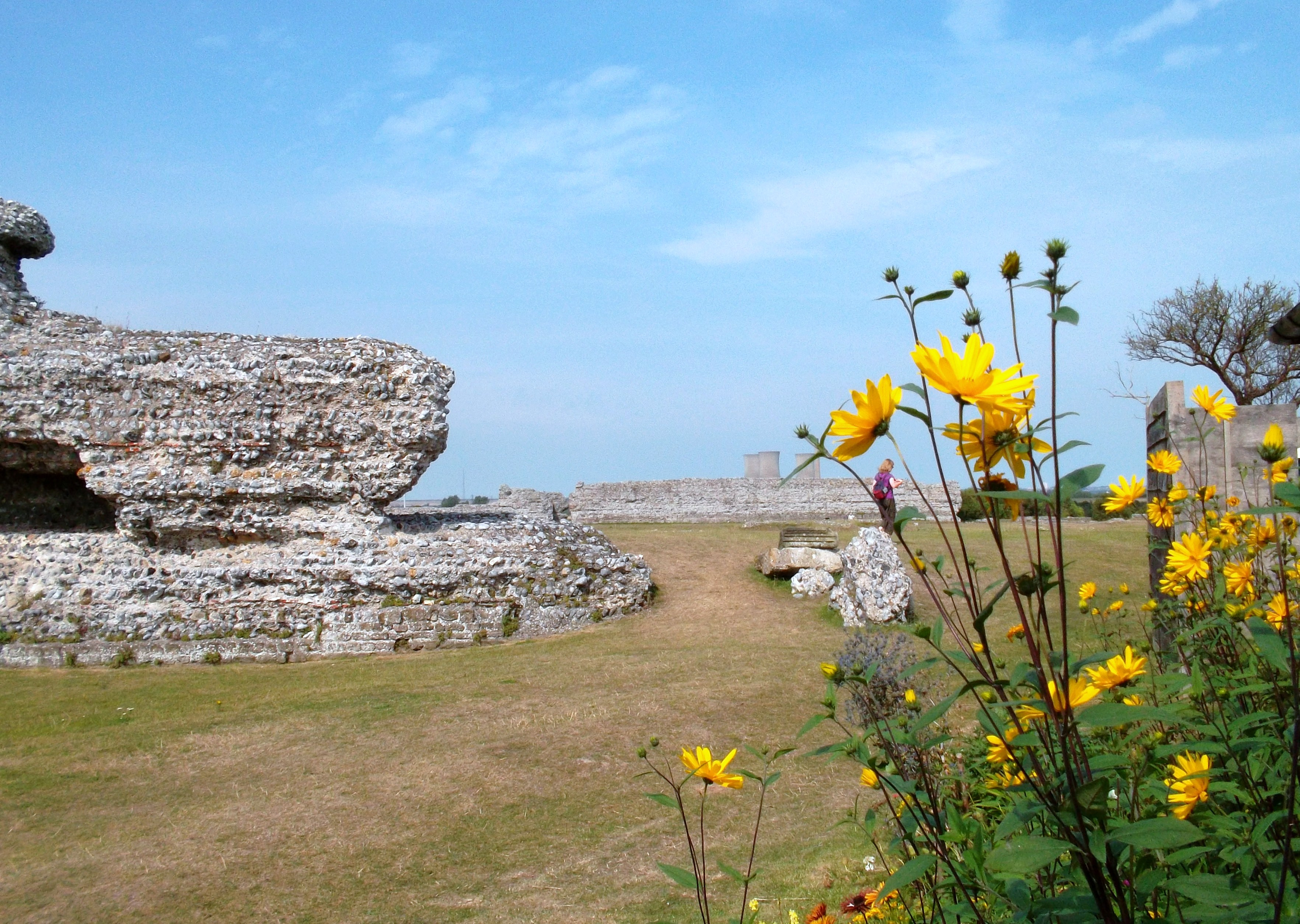
- The remains of Richborough Roman Fort

- Location within Kent
- OS grid reference: TR315605
  - London: 103.5 km (64.3 mi)
- District: Dover
- Shire county: Kent
- Region: South East
- Country: England
- Sovereign state: United Kingdom
- Post town: SANDWICH
- Postcode district: CT13
- Dialling code: 01304
- Police: Kent
- Fire: Kent
- Ambulance: South East Coast
- UK Parliament: Herne Bay and Sandwich

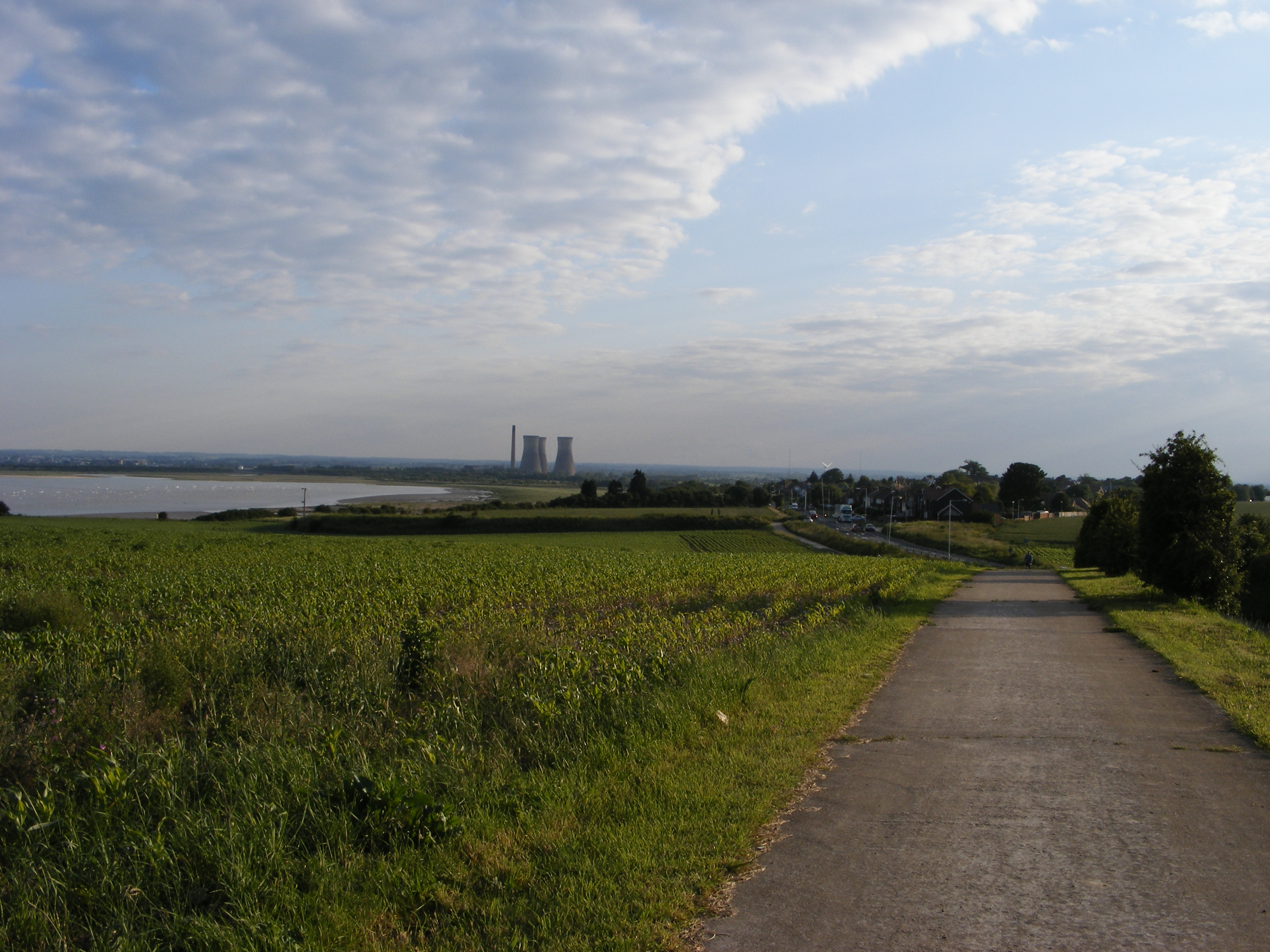
Looking towards Richborough

Richborough (/ˈrɪtʃbərə/) is a settlement north of Sandwich on the east coast of the county of Kent, England. Richborough lies close to the Isle of Thanet. The population of the settlement is included in the civil parish of Ash.

Although now some distance from the sea, Richborough stood at the southern end of the Wantsum Channel from prehistory to the early medieval period. The channel provided a safe searoute from the continent to the Thames estuary and separated the Isle of Thanet from the mainland.

The channel has now silted up, but prior to this, Richborough was an important natural harbour and was the landing place of the Roman invasion of Britain in AD 43. Until October 2008 there was uncertainty whether this was the site of the Claudian invasion of Britain; two ditches at the site which have been dated to the Roman period were interpreted as defensive structures; however, some archaeologists had favoured the theory that the landing took place in the vicinity of modern-day Chichester. The 2008 discovery proved that this was a defensive site of a Roman beachhead, protecting 700 metres (770 yd) of coast.

The suffragan bishop of Richborough, in the Diocese of Canterbury, was created in 1995 to provide a second provincial episcopal visitor (after Ebbsfleet) for the Province of Canterbury.

== Roman and Saxon history ==
The Romans founded the site and, after their withdrawal, the site was occupied by a Saxon religious settlement subsequent to St Augustine's landing in 597 at nearby Ebbsfleet. By the time of the Venerable Bede, the Romano-British place name Rutupiae had "by the English now corrupted into Reptacaestir."

The site is managed by English Heritage who run historical events on the site throughout the summer.

== Secret harbour of 1916 ==
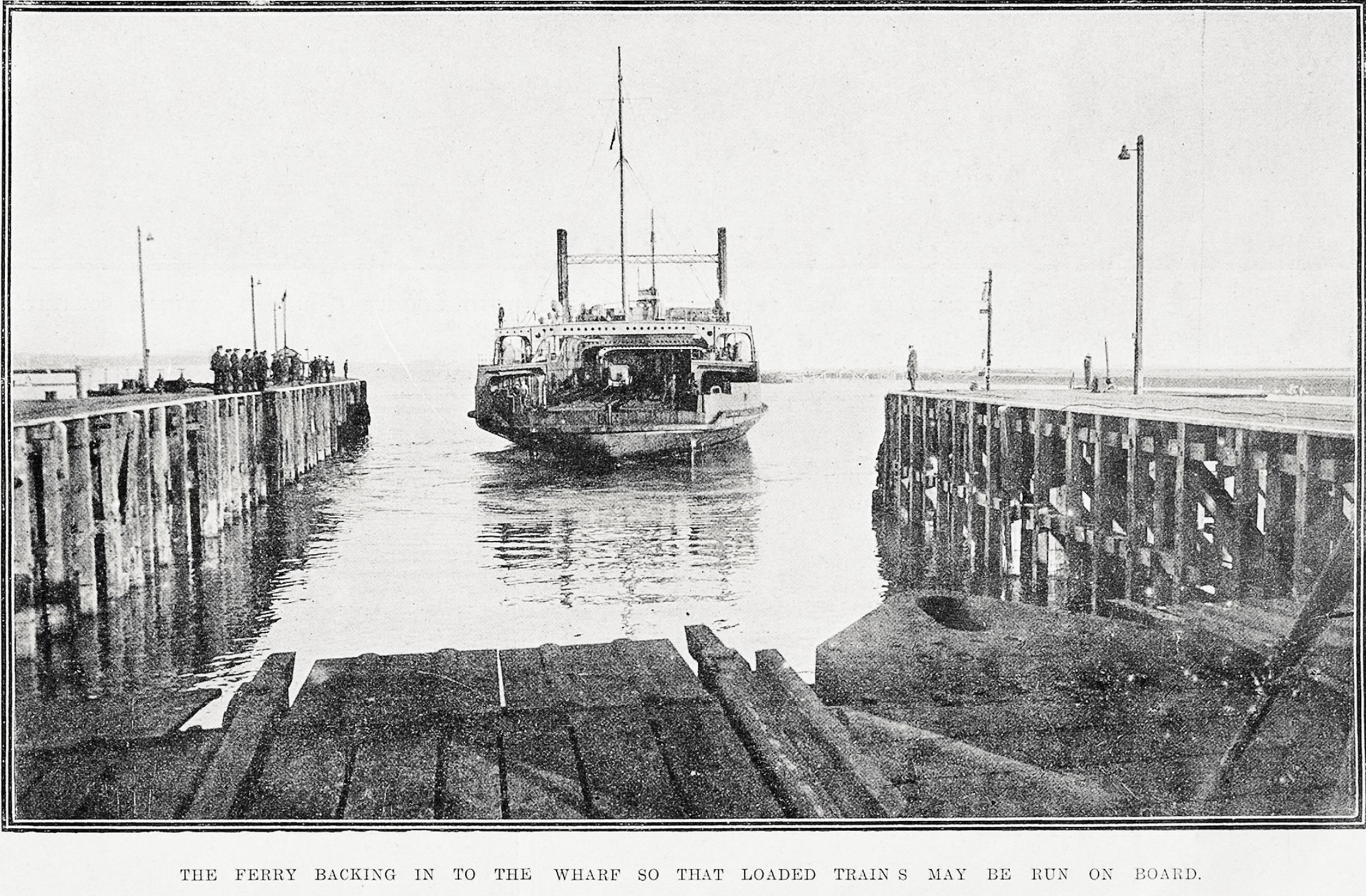
Train ferry backing into Richborough wharf about 1919

During the First World War the capacity of Dover and other nearby ports was found to be inadequate, and a major harbour was constructed at Richborough. Its purpose was to provide the British Expeditionary Force with its heavy equipment (tanks, guns, railway locomotives, ammunition, horses and fuel).

In 1917, the British Government began to look into the possibility of installing a cross-Channel train ferry at Richborough to allow roll-on/roll-off transportation of railway rolling stock, artillery and supplies to the allied Front Lines. This was the first time that sea-going roll-on/roll-off ferries had been used from Britain. Three new train ferries were built SS Train Ferry No. 1, SS Train Ferry No. 2 and SS Train Ferry No. 3 and operations began on 10 February 1918, conveying nearly 900 tons of cargo at a time between Richborough and Calais and Dunkirk. Although existing barge services were still in operation across the Channel from Richborough, the use of train-ferries was more practical for larger and heavier cargos, such as tanks.

The use of train-ferries greatly reduced the amount of labour required in the transport of these items. It took only 30 to 40 minutes to load or unload the 54 railway wagons and fifty or sixty motor vehicles that could be carried by these train-ferries. An analysis done at the time found that to transport 1,000 tons of war material from the point of manufacture to the front by conventional means involved the use of 1,500 labourers, whereas when using train-ferries that number decreased to around 100 labourers.

To accommodate the train-ferries, a new type of terminal had to be designed and built at Richbrough, Calais and Dunkirk. Adjustable steel bridges with two sets of railway lines, spanning between 80 and 100 feet depending on the local conditions at the each port, were installed at each of the three ports to allow a true connection between railway lines on shore and the tracks on the ferry.

By mid-1918 it had become a very large site, occupying 2000 acres and capable of handling 20,000 tons of traffic each week.

After the signing of the Armistice on 11 November 1918, train ferries were used extensively for the return of material from the Front. Indeed, according to war office statistics, a greater tonnage of material was transported by train ferry via Richborough in 1919 than in 1918. As the train ferries had space for motor transport as well as railway rolling stock, thousands of lorries, motor cars and "B Type" buses used these ferries to return to England.

== Richborough Power Station ==
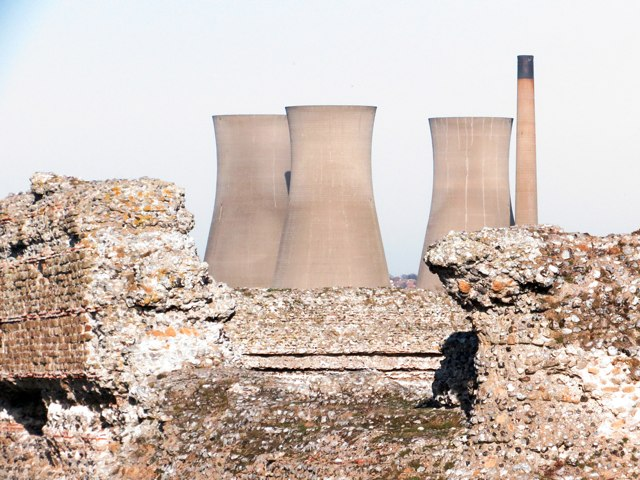
Richborough power station, since demolished; here an interesting contrast between ancient and modern

The Richborough Power Station was opened, within the port, in 1962 burning coal as its fuel. Then in 1971 it was converted to run on oil before it was finally converted again to burn the controversial bitumen-based fuel Orimulsion during the final years of operation. Orimulsion is an emulsion originating from the Orinoco Basin, which was offloaded here. The plant closed down in 1996, but much of it remained in situ until the demolition of the three cooling towers on 11 March 2012. A new Energy Park is planned for the site, including a Diesel Peak Generator.

== Bibliography ==
- Bushe-Fox, J. P., Third report on the excavations of the Roman fort at Richborough, Kent, Oxford: The University Press; London: The Society of Antiquaries, Reports of the Research Committee of the Society of Antiquaries of London 10, 1932 (BSA)
- Bushe-Fox, J. P., Fourth report on the excavations of the Roman fort at Richborough, Kent, Oxford: The University Press; London: The Society of Antiquaries, Reports of the Research Committee of the Society of Antiquaries of London 16, 1949 (BSA)
- Butler, Robert, Sandwich Haven and Richborough Port, Sandwich Local History Society, 1996
- Cunliffe, B. W., Fifth report on the excavations of the Roman fort at Richborough, Kent, Oxford: The University Press: for the Society of Antiquaries, Reports of the Research Committee of the Society of Antiquaries of London 23, 1968 (BSA)
- Johnston, D. E., The Saxon Shore, London: Council for British Archaeology, CBA Research Report 18, 1977
- Pratt, Edwin A. British Railways and the Great War, 2 vols. Vol 1 • Vol. 2 London: Selwyn and Blount, 1921
