= SS Vienna (1929) =

UK North Sea ferry, converted into a troop ship

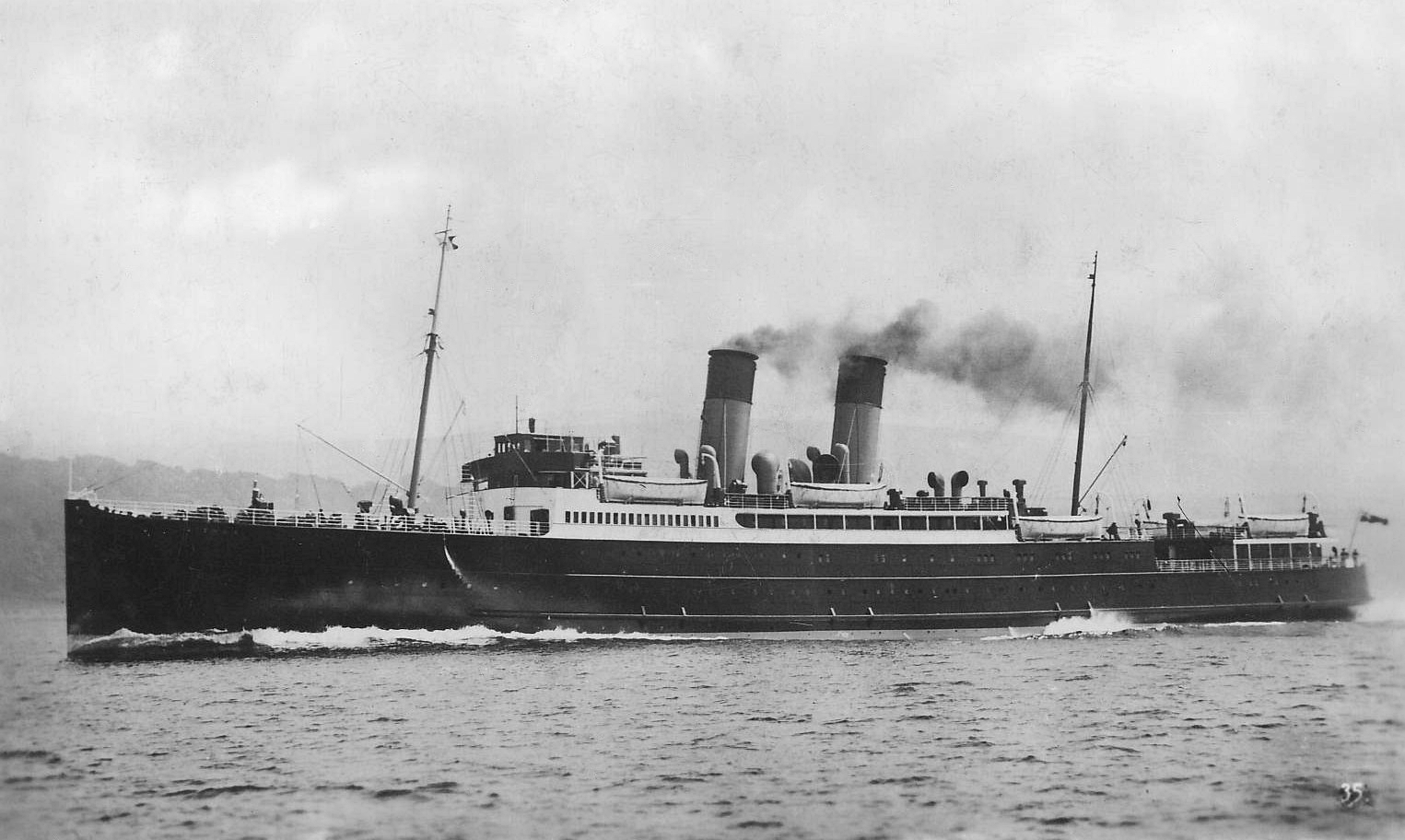
- Vienna under way

History

United Kingdom
- Name: Vienna
- Namesake: Vienna
- Owner: 1929: LNER; 1944: Ministry of War Transport; 1946: Ministry of Transport
- Operator: 1942: (United Kingdom) Royal Navy; 1944: LNER
- Port of registry: 1929: (United Kingdom) Harwich; 1944: (United Kingdom) London
- Route: 1929: Harwich – Hook of Holland; 1944: Tilbury – Ostend; 1945: Harwich – Hook of Holland
- Builder: John Brown & Co, Clydebank
- Yard number: 527
- Launched: 10 April 1929
- Completed: July 1929
- Commissioned: into Royal Navy, June 1942
- Decommissioned: from Royal Navy, October 1944
- Identification: UK official number 161034; until 1933: code letters LDKT; by 1930: call sign GTBR
- Fate: scrapped, 1960

General characteristics
- Type: North Sea ferry
- Tonnage: 4,218 GRT, 1,992 NRT
- Length: 366 ft 0 in (111.56 m) overall; 350.8 ft (106.9 m) registered
- Beam: 50.1 ft (15.3 m)
- Draught: 15 ft 3 in (4.6 m)
- Depth: 26.0 ft (7.9 m)
- Decks: 2
- Installed power: 4 × steam turbines; single reduction gearing; 1,520 NHP
- Propulsion: 2 × screws
- Speed: 21 knots (39 km/h)
- Capacity: Passengers: 444 × 1st class, and 104 × 2nd class
- Sensors & processing systems: as built: submarine signalling; by 1936: as above, plus echo sounding device; by 1946: as above, plus radar
- Notes: sister ships: Prague, Amsterdam

SS Vienna was a UK North Sea ferry. She was built in Scotland in 1929 for the London and North Eastern Railway (LNER). In the Second World War she was at first a troopship, and was then the Royal Navy motor torpedo boat depot ship HMS Vienna. After the war, she was a Government-owned troopship for the British Army of the Rhine, plying between the Netherlands and England. She was scrapped in England in 1960.

She was the second of two railway-owned Harwich-based ferries to be named after the Austrian capital Vienna. The first Vienna was built in 1894, and scrapped in 1930.

== Building ==
In 1929 and 1930, John Brown & Co of Clydebank, Glasgow, built three sister ships for the LNER. On 10 April 1929, Lady Barrie, wife of Sir Charles Barrie, launched yard number 527 as Vienna. The ship was completed that July. Yard number 528 was launched on 18 November 1929 as Prague, and yard number 529 was launched on 30 January 1930 as Amsterdam.

Vienna's lengths were 366 ft 0 in (111.56 m) overall and 350.8 ft (106.9 m) registered. Her beam was 50.1 ft (15.3 m), her depth was 26.0 ft (7.9 m), and her draught was 15 ft 3 in (4.6 m). For overnight crossings of the North Sea she had berths for 548 passengers: 444 in first class, and 104 in second class. She had twin screws, each driven by two Brown-Curtis steam turbines via single reduction gearing. The combined power of her four turbines was rated at 1,520 NHP, and gave her a speed of 21 knots (39 km/h).

== Career ==
The LNER registered Vienna at Harwich. Her UK official number was 161034, and her code letters were LDKT. By 1930 her wireless telegraph call sign was GTBR, and by 1934 this had superseded her code letters. From new, she was equipped with submarine signalling. By 1936, she was equipped also with an echo sounding device.

Vienna entered service in 1929 on the GER's route linking Harwich and the Hook of Holland. From 1932 to 1939 she also made summer cruises to Amsterdam, Rotterdam, Vlissingen, Zeebrugge; and Rouen. For this service, extra lounge space was installed, and her promenade deck was extended. In July 1935, she represented the LNER at the fleet review off Spithead to commemorate the Silver Jubilee of George V.

In July 1932, the LNER ferry Malines was holed in a collision in the Scheldt. Vienna rescued 131 passengers from Malines, with their baggage, and landed them at Antwerp.

In the Phoney War from December 1939 until May 1940, Vienna was a troop ship, linking Southampton with Le Havre; and Cherbourg. In June 1940 she evacuated personnel from both Le Havre and Cherbourg in Operation Cycle, and 2,346 servicemen from Brest in Operation Aerial. That July she went to Swansea for conversion into a fleet oiler, but in April 1941 the conversion was discontinued.

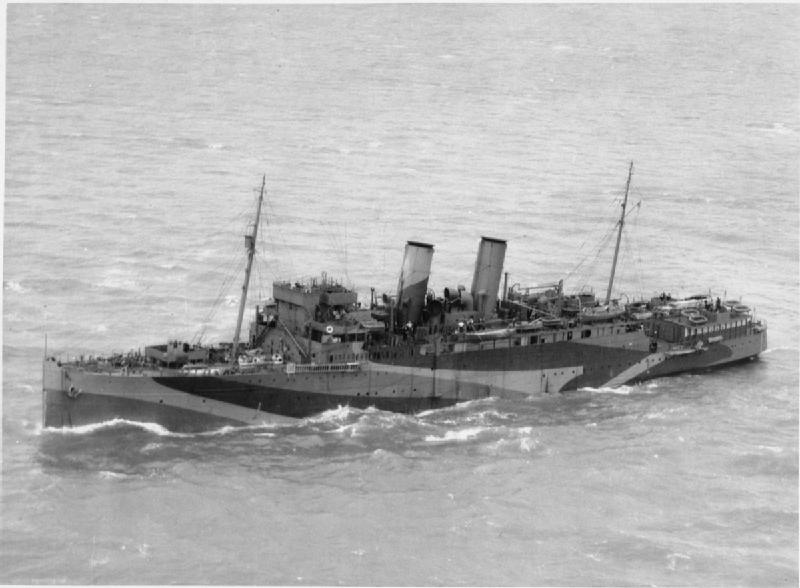
Aerial photograph of HMS Vienna

Instead, she was converted into a depot ship for motor torpedo boats, and in June 1942 was commissioned as HMS Vienna. She took part in Allied operations in French North Africa, and in 1943 took part in the Allied invasion of Sicily. She was later based in Bari and Brindisi to support Allied operations in the Adriatic. In October 1944 she returned to the UK, was decommissioned from the Navy, and reverted to being a troop ship.

However, instead of being returned to her owners, she became the property of the Ministry of War Transport, with the LNER managing her on the MoWT's behalf. Her registration was transferred from Harwich to London. At first she carried troops between Tilbury and Ostend. In 1945 she was transferred to her former route linking Harwich with Hook of Holland, carrying personnel of the British Army of the Rhine. By 1946 she was equipped with radar, and that year the Ministry of Transport succeeded the MoWT as her owner. By 1948 the railway had ceased managing her for the Ministry.

In 1960 Vienna was withdrawn from service. On 4 September that year she arrived in Ghent to be scrapped.

== Bibliography ==
- Duckworth, Christian Leslie Dyce; Langmuir, Graham Easton (1968). Railway and other Steamers. Prescot: T. Stephenson and Sons. ISBN 978-0901314123.
- Lloyd's Register of Shipping (PDF). Vol. II.–Steamers and Motorships of 300 Tons Gross and Over. London: Lloyd's Register of Shipping. 1930 – via Southampton City Council.
- Lloyd's Register of Shipping (PDF). Vol. II.–Steamers and Motorships of 300 Tons Gross and Over. London: Lloyd's Register of Shipping. 1934 – via Southampton City Council.
- Lloyd's Register of Shipping (PDF). Vol. II.–Steamers and Motorships over 300 Tons. London: Lloyd's Register of Shipping. 1936 – via Southampton City Council.
- Lloyd's Register of Shipping (PDF). Vol. II.–Steamers and Motorships of 300 Tons. Trawlers, Tugs, Dredgers, Etc. London: Lloyd's Register of Shipping. 1944 – via Southampton City Council.
- Lloyd's Register of Shipping. Vol. Steamers and Motorships of 300 Tons Gross and Over. London: Lloyd's Register of Shipping. 1946 – via Internet Archive.
- Lloyd's Register of Shipping. Vol. Steamers and Motorships of 300 Tons Gross and Over. London: Lloyd's Register of Shipping. 1947 – via Internet Archive.
- Mercantile Navy List. London: Registrar General of Shipping and Seamen. 1930 – via Crew List Index Project.
- Register Book. Vol. I Register of Ships. London: Lloyd's Register of Shipping. 1955 – via Internet Archive.
