= SS Train Ferry No. 1 =

Ship built in 1917

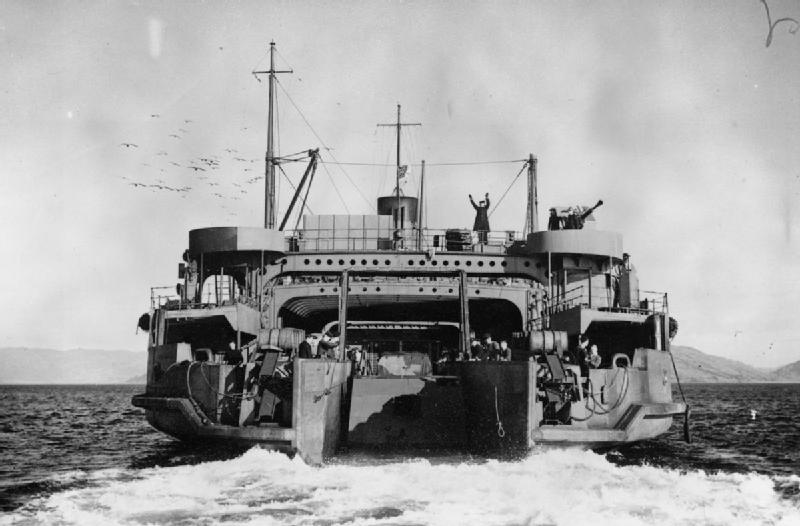
- As Princess Iris

History
- Name: 1917–1940: TSS Train Ferry No. 1; 1940–1942: TSS Iris; 1942–1946: TSS Princess Iris; 1946–1956: TSS Essex Ferry; 1956–1957: TSS Essex Ferry II
- Operator: 1917–1924: War Office; 1924–1934: Great Eastern Railway; 1934–1940, 1946–48: London & North Eastern Railway; 1940–1946: Royal Navy; 1948–1957: British Railways
- Port of registry: (United Kingdom)
- Builder: Armstrong Whitworth
- Yard number: 921
- Launched: 3 August 1917
- Completed: November 1917
- Out of service: 26 February 1957
- Fate: Scrapped 1957

General characteristics
- Type: Train ferry
- Tonnage: 2,683 gross register tons (GRT)
- Length: 350.6 ft (106.9 m)
- Beam: 58.7 ft (17.9 m)
- Depth: 15 ft 6 in (4.72 m)
- Installed power: 403 nhp
- Propulsion: 2 x triple expansion engines
- Speed: 12 knots

TSS Train Ferry No. 1 was a Roll-on/roll-off freight vessel built for the British War Office in 1917 to transport rail freight to Europe during World War I. After the war, it was used for civilian purposes until World War II when it was converted to carry and launch landing craft

After the war, it returned to ferry use and scrapped in 1957.

== History ==
The ship was built by Armstrong Whitworth, Newcastle upon Tyne and launched in 1917. Along with her sister ships SS Train Ferry No. 2 and SS Train Ferry No. 3, they were the first vessels to offer regular transport between Britain and continental Europe for rail freight vehicles. They were ordered by the British Army to provide rail freight transport from the military Port Richborough to the continent to sustain the war effort eing quicker to load and unload in port. They had four sets of rails along the train deck and used a link span to load when in harbour.

After their use by the British Army ended in 1922, they were purchased by the Great Eastern Railway and moved to Harwich where the landing stage was re-erected (Note: The original Port Richborough portal frame is still in service, 2019) to provide a service to Zeebrugge in conjunction with the Belgian Government through a joint company, the Great Eastern Train Ferry Company. The Great Eastern Railway was taken over by the London & North Eastern Railway (LNER) in 1923 with its interest in the Great Eastern Train Ferry Company. The new service was inaugurated on 24 April 1924 by the Duke of Kent.

On 13 December 1924 she collided with two lighters in the river near Antwerp but the incident was without loss of life.

In 1934, the Great Eastern Train Ferry Company was liquidated and she was bought by the LNER.

In 1940 she was requisitioned by the Royal Navy and renamed Iris. She assisted with the evacuation of the Channel Islands. In 1941 she was converted to a Landing Craft Carrier, and the twin funnels were incorporated into a single stack. In 1942 she was renamed again to Princess Iris.

Princess Iris could carry fourteen landing craft on the train deck and four more on the upper deck. Those on the train deck were launched down a chute at the stern (hence classified as "Landing Ship Stern Chute"); those on the upper deck were unloaded by crane, During the war she was mostly used for transporting landing craft.

In 1946 she returned to the LNER and renamed Essex Ferry. She was in service with British Railways from 1948 until 1956 when she was withdrawn from service, renamed Essex Ferry II and then scrapped at Grays in 1957.

== Bibliography ==
- Anderson, Richard M. (1990). "Re: Mystery Photo No. 97". Warship International. XXVII (2): 107. ISSN 0043-0374.
- Atherton, D. (1990). "Re: Mystery Photo No. 97". Warship International. XXVII (2): 108–110. ISSN 0043-0374.
- Dittmar, Fred (1990). "Re: Mystery Photo No. 97". Warship International. XXVII (2): 107. ISSN 0043-0374.
- Heine, Paul J. (1990). "Re: Mystery Photo No. 97". Warship International. XXVII (2): 107–108. ISSN 0043-0374.
