= SS Amsterdam (1894) =

Passenger vessel (1894–1928)

History
- Name: TSS Amsterdam
- Operator: 1894–1923: Great Eastern Railway; 1923–1938: London and North Eastern Railway
- Builder: Earle's Shipbuilding, Hull
- Launched: 24 January 1894
- Out of service: 1928
- Fate: Scrapped 1928

General characteristics
- Tonnage: 1,745 gross register tons (GRT)
- Length: 302.4 feet (92.2 m)
- Beam: 36 feet (11 m)
- Depth: 16.2 feet (4.9 m)

TSS Amsterdam was a passenger vessel built for the Great Eastern Railway in 1894.

== History ==
The ship was built by Earle's Shipbuilding, Hull for the Great Eastern Railway and launched on 24 January 1894. She was launched by Mrs. Van Hasselt, wife of one of the Directors of the Holland Railway. Many members of Amsterdam Town Council were present at the launch, which showed the importance of this new service to the city. She was the second vessel launched that year by the Great Eastern Railway after the Berlin on 10 January 1894.

Initially placed on the Harwich to Hook of Holland route she was transferred to the Antwerp service in 1910.

In 1923 she fell under the ownership of the London and North Eastern Railway. She was scrapped in 1928.
