= SS Staveley (1891) =

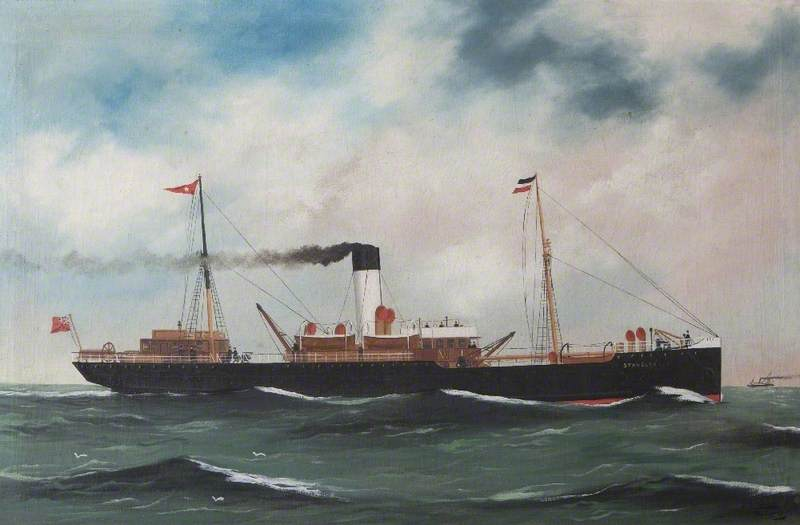
- The Staveley, by A. J. Jansen

History
- Name: SS Staveley
- Operator: 1891–1897: Manchester, Sheffield and Lincolnshire Railway; 1897–1923: Great Central Railway; 1923–1932: London and North Eastern Railway; 1932–1933: British and Irish Steam Packet Company
- Port of registry: (United Kingdom)
- Builder: Swan Hunter
- Yard number: 166
- Launched: 1 May 1891
- Out of service: 1933
- Fate: Scrapped 1933

General characteristics
- Tonnage: 1,033 gross register tons (GRT)
- Length: 240.2 feet (73.2 m)
- Beam: 32 feet (9.8 m)
- Depth: 15.2 feet (4.6 m)

SS Staveley was a passenger and freight vessel built for the Manchester, Sheffield and Lincolnshire Railway in 1891.

== History ==
The ship was built by Swan Hunter in Wallsend and launched on 1 May 1891. She was placed on the Grimsby to Hamburg route with her sister ships SS Lutterworth and SS Nottingham. In 1893 she made a record breaking trip between Grimsby and Hamburg in 25 hours 55 minutes.

In 1897 she was acquired by the Great Central Railway. On 10 July 1914 she was involved in a collision in fog with an unknown vessel about 60 miles off Spurn Head. When she arrived in Grimsby, a large rent extended almost to the water line.

In 1923 she was acquired by the London and North Eastern Railway who kept her in service until 1932 when she was sold to the British and Irish Steam Packet Company who scrapped her in 1933.
