= SS Nottingham =

History
- Name: 1891–1915: SS Nottingham; 1915–1918: SS Notts; 1918–1935: SS Nottingham
- Operator: 1891–1897: Manchester, Sheffield and Lincolnshire Railway; 1897–1923: Great Central Railway; 1915–1918: Royal Navy; 1918–1923: Great Central Railway; 1923–1935: London and North Eastern Railway
- Builder: Swan Hunter
- Yard number: 164
- Launched: 13 March 1891
- Fate: Scrapped 1935

General characteristics
- Tonnage: 1,033 gross register tons (GRT)
- Length: 240.2 feet (73.2 m)
- Beam: 32 feet (9.8 m)
- Depth: 15.2 feet (4.6 m)

SS Nottingham was a passenger and freight vessel built for the Manchester, Sheffield and Lincolnshire Railway in 1891.

== History ==
The ship was built by Swan Hunter in Wallsend and launched on 13 March 1891. She was placed on the Grimsby to Hamburg route with her sister ships SS Lutterworth and SS Staveley, but in 1897 she was transferred to the Grimsby to Rotterdam service.

In 1897 she was acquired by the Great Central Railway. On 11 December 1912 she went ashore in thick fog on Scrooby Sands. Despite the efforts of the tug, United Service, she could not be got off, so the 12 passengers were taken by United Service to Yarmouth, and landed them in the afternoon. She was refloated later that day. A year later, on 26 December 1913, she was grounded again, this time on a mud bank near the Royal Dock in Grimsby.

In 1915 she was requisitioned by the Admiralty as a naval supply vessel and became HMS Notts. After the war she was refurbished and returned to the Great Central Railway as SS Nottingham. In 1923 she was acquired by the London and North Eastern Railway who kept her in service until she was scrapped in 1935.
