= SS Malines =

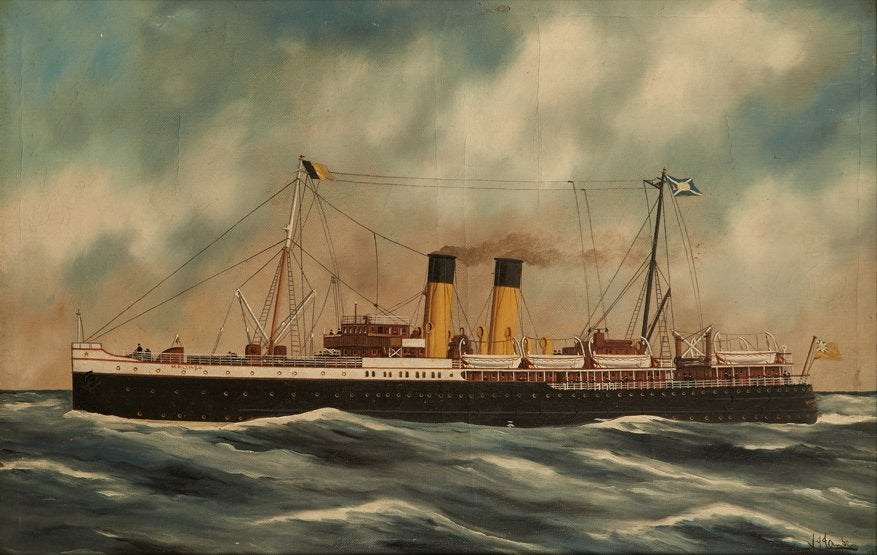
- Malines, by A. J. Jansen

History
- Name: 1921–1940: TSS Malines; 1940–1948: HMS Malines
- Operator: 1921–1923: Great Eastern Railway; 1923–1940: London and North Eastern Railway; 1940–1944: Royal Navy; 1944–1948: Ministry of War Transport
- Builder: Armstrong, Whitworth and Company
- Yard number: 972
- Launched: 6 January 1921
- Maiden voyage: 21 March 1922
- Out of service: April 1948
- Fate: Scrapped

General characteristics
- Tonnage: 2,969 gross register tons (GRT)
- Length: 320.7 feet (97.7 m)
- Beam: 43.2 feet (13.2 m)
- Depth: 25.7 feet (7.8 m)
- Installed power: 1525 nhp
- Propulsion: 4 Brown-Curtis steam turbines
- Speed: 21 knots
- Capacity: 360 passengers

TSS Malines was a passenger vessel built for the Great Eastern Railway in 1921.

== History ==
The ship was built by Armstrong Whitworth and Company in High Walker and launched on 6 January 1921 by Mrs. John Kenneth Foster. She was a sister ship for the Antwerp and Bruges which were introduced on the Harwich to Antwerp service in 1920. She made her maiden voyage to Antwerp on 21 March 1922. The Great Eastern Railway was taken over by the London and North Eastern Railway company in 1923.

In 1932 she was in collision with the tanker Hanseat, and was run on to a sandbank in the River Scheldt. She was refloated by six tugs and towed up the river to be docked in Antwerp. On 7 May 1933 she was in collision in the fairway off Flushing with the Swedish steamer Jamaica (945 tons), and the collision resulted in the sinking of the Jamaica. In 1936 she was in collision with the Dutch vessel Almkirk (6,810 tons), but there were no casualties.

In 1940 she was requisitioned by the Royal Navy and renamed HMS Malines. She was used as an auxiliary Convoy Escort Vessel. On 19 July 1942 she was torpedoed by German aircraft and beached near Port Said, Egypt. She was refloated in January 1943 and used as a training hulk through the end of the War. In June 1945 she was towed by Empire tug Susan from Port Said to Falmouth, but the journey was delayed when the hold filled with water between Gibraltar and Lisbon. She eventually returned to the Tyne on 8 November 1945.
