= SS Prague =

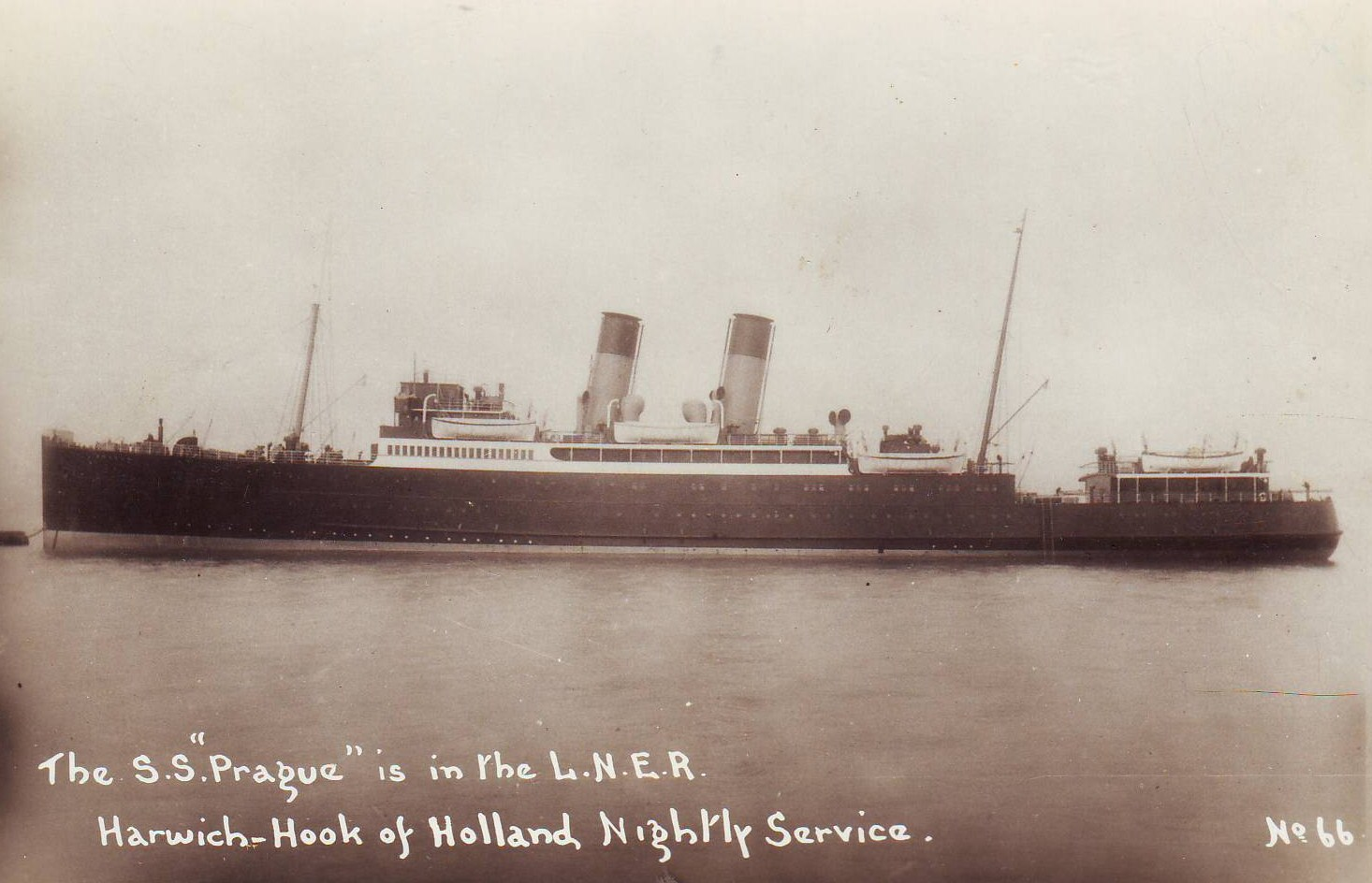
- Photo from 28 May 1930

History
- Name: TSS Prague
- Operator: London and North Eastern Railway
- Port of registry: (United Kingdom)
- Builder: John Brown, Clydebank
- Yard number: 528
- Launched: 18 November 1929
- Out of service: 1948
- Fate: Scrapped 1948

General characteristics
- Tonnage: 4,220 gross register tons (GRT)
- Length: 350 feet (110 m)
- Beam: 50 feet (15 m)

TSS Prague was a passenger and freight vessel built for the London and North Eastern Railway in 1929. The first group of Kindertransport refugees to arrive in the UK did so aboard the Prague, in December 1938.

== History ==
The ship was built by John Brown on Clydebank. She was one of an order for three ships, the others being Vienna and Amsterdam. She was launched on 18 November 1929. She arrived in Harwich Parkeston Quay on 22 February 1930.

In June 1932 she collided with a Belgian fishing smack in dense fog which resulted in the fishing boat sinking in less than 2 minutes, and four of the five crew were drowned.

She brought the first group of unaccompanied child refugees to Britain from Nazi Germany, arriving at Parkeston Quay on 2 December 1938. A plaque unveiled in 2011 at Harwich harbour marks this event.

At the outbreak of the Second World War the ship was requisitioned by the Ministry of War Transport. The Prague was one of seven Harwich ships which took part in the 1940 evacuations from Dunkirk. She made three trips between May 28 and June 1, 1940. It was during her third trip that she was dive-bombed. Captain Baxter, the master, avoided a direct hit by evasive action. One of her engines was put out of action and she rapidly filled with water aft. Almost three thousand French troops were taken off by other vessels in mid Channel whilst still maintaining her best speed The Prague was eventually beached near Deal, Kent. The ship's chief engineer, Walter Ernest Oxenham was awarded the DSC for his part in the action. In 1944, Prague served in the D-Day landings. SS Prague made more than 50 return journeys as a hospital ship after D-Day

She was sent to Clydebank for refurbishing in 1947 but was severely damaged by fire, and sent for scrapping in September 1948.
