= SS Amsterdam (1930) =

History

United Kingdom
- Name: 1930–1941: TSS Amsterdam; 1941–1944: HMHS Amsterdam
- Operator: 1930–1941: London and North Eastern Railway; 1941–1944: Royal Navy
- Builder: John Brown, Clydebank
- Yard number: 529
- Launched: 30 January 1930
- Identification: UK Official Number: 161037
- Fate: Struck a mine and sank, 7 August 1944

General characteristics
- Tonnage: 4,220 gross register tons (GRT)
- Length: 350.8 feet (106.9 m)
- Beam: 50.1 feet (15.3 m)
- Depth: 26 feet (7.9 m)

TSS Amsterdam was a passenger and freight vessel built for the London and North Eastern Railway in 1930.

== History ==
The ship was built by John Brown on Clydebank. She was one of an order for three ships, the others being Vienna and Prague. She was launched on 30 January 1930.

On 14 October 1932, she brought Prince George, Duke of Kent back from his tour of Denmark, Sweden and the Netherlands.

== War service ==
In September 1939, at the outbreak of the Second World War, the ship was requisitioned by the Ministry of War Transport for troop transport. This included transporting the 51st Highland Division and Princess Louise's Kensington Regiment from Southampton to Le Havre in April 1940 as part of the British Expeditionary Force.

By 1944, she had been converted to an LSI(H), a Landing Ship Infantry (Hand-hoisting). She carried elements of the American 2nd Ranger Battalion to Pointe du Hoc on D-Day.

She was converted to a hospital ship and departed for Normandy on 19 July 1944 to pick up her first casualties. On 7 August, on her third trip, she was sunk by a mine while returning with wounded from Juno Beach, Calvados, France. A total of 55 patients, ten Royal Army Medical Corps staff, 30 crew and eleven prisoners of war were killed. Two nurses, Matron Dorothy Anyta Field, 32, and Sister Mollie Evershed, 27, are credited with helping save 75 lives, going below deck again and again to help others get to the lifeboats; they themselves went down with the ship. One survivor reported seeing two people stuck in portholes as the ship sank; he stated he "was told afterwards that they were nurses." According to one news report, a member of the Royal Army Medical Corps said he tried unsuccessfully "to rescue a nursing officer through the porthole in the lower deck in which she'd been trapped". The two nurses are the only women whose names are on the British Normandy Memorial, with 22,442 men. Lily McNicholas (1909–1998), an Irish nurse, survived the sinking and was awarded an MBE for her heroism.
