= SS Arnhem (1946) =

Passenger and cargo vessel

History

United Kingdom
- Name: TSS Arnhem
- Operator: 1946–1948: London and North Eastern Railway; 1948–1968: British Railways
- Port of registry: (United Kingdom)
- Builder: John Brown, Clydebank
- Yard number: 636
- Launched: 7 November 1946
- Out of service: 1968
- Fate: Scrapped 1968

General characteristics
- Tonnage: 5,005 gross register tons (GRT)
- Length: 377 feet (115 m)
- Beam: 54 feet (16 m)
- Draught: 15 feet (4.6 m)

TSS Arnhem was a passenger and cargo vessel built for the London and North Eastern Railway in 1946.

== History ==
The ship was built by John Brown on Clydebank and launched on 7 November 1946. She was the first in a series of ships to replace war losses, and was the first oil-fired ship ordered by the company. She had capacity for 600 passengers, and 50,000 cubic feet (1,400 m^{3}) of grain.

In March 1953 she rescued 29 men from the Swedish ship Rigel (3,823 tons) which sank after a collision with an Italian vessel Senegal (1,650 tons) some 60 miles from Ostend.

Initially she was a single class vessel but was converted for first and second classes in 1954.

She was taken over by the British Railways in 1948.

She was scrapped in 1968 by Thos. W. Ward at Inverkeithing.
