= SS Train Ferry No. 2 =

Locomotive

History
- Name: TSS Train Ferry No. 2
- Operator: 1917–1924: British Army War Office; 1924–1934: Great Eastern Railway as Great Eastern Train Ferry Company Limited; 1934–1940: London and North Eastern Railway; 1940: Royal Navy
- Port of registry: (United Kingdom)
- Builder: Armstrong, Whitworth & Company Ltd, Low Walker
- Yard number: 922
- Launched: 12 September 1917
- Fate: Sunk 13 June 1940

General characteristics
- Tonnage: 2,678 gross register tons (GRT)
- Length: 350.5 feet (106.8 m)
- Beam: 58.7 feet (17.9 m)
- Depth: 15.5 feet (4.7 m)

TSS Train Ferry No. 2 was a freight vessel built for the British Army War Office in 1917.

== History ==
The ship was built by Armstrong, Whitworth & Company Ltd, Low Walker and launched in 1917. Along with her sister ships SS Train Ferry No. 1 and SS Train Ferry No. 3, they were the first vessels to offer regular transport between Britain and continental Europe for rail freight vehicles. They were ordered by the British Army to provide rail freight transport from Richborough harbour to the continent to sustain the war effort. They had four sets of rails along the train deck and used a link span to load when in harbour.

On 1 February 1919 she was involved in the rescue of British and American soldiers from the American transport USS Narrangansett which had gone ashore on Bembridge Point, Isle of Wight. In March 1922 she was sent to Ireland to expedite the transfer of surplus Army motor transport. She made several voyages from Cork and Dublin to Liverpool but was back at Plymouth in December.

After their use by the British Army ended in 1922, they were purchased by the Great Eastern Railway

The Great Eastern Railway was taken over by the London and North Eastern Railway company in 1923 with its interest in the Great Eastern Train Ferry Company. The new service was inaugurated on 24 April 1924 by Prince George, Duke of Kent. In November 1928 the journey from Zeebrugge to Harwich was delayed by a gale and took 23 hours rather than the usual 7 and a half.

In 1934, the Great Eastern Train Ferry Company was liquidated and she was bought by the London and North Eastern Railway.

In 1940 she was requisitioned by the Royal Navy. During evacuation of British troops from France she was hit by artillery from the shore and sank on 13 June 1940 off Saint-Valery-en-Caux, Seine Maritime, at 49°56′N 00°56′E.

== Bibliography ==
- Anderson, Richard M. (1990). "Re: Mystery Photo No. 97". Warship International. XXVII (2): 107. ISSN 0043-0374.
- Atherton, D. (1990). "Re: Mystery Photo No. 97". Warship International. XXVII (2): 108–110. ISSN 0043-0374.
- Dittmar, Fred (1990). "Re: Mystery Photo No. 97". Warship International. XXVII (2): 107. ISSN 0043-0374.
- Heine, Paul J. (1990). "Re: Mystery Photo No. 97". Warship International. XXVII (2): 107–108. ISSN 0043-0374.
