= SS Train Ferry No. 3 =

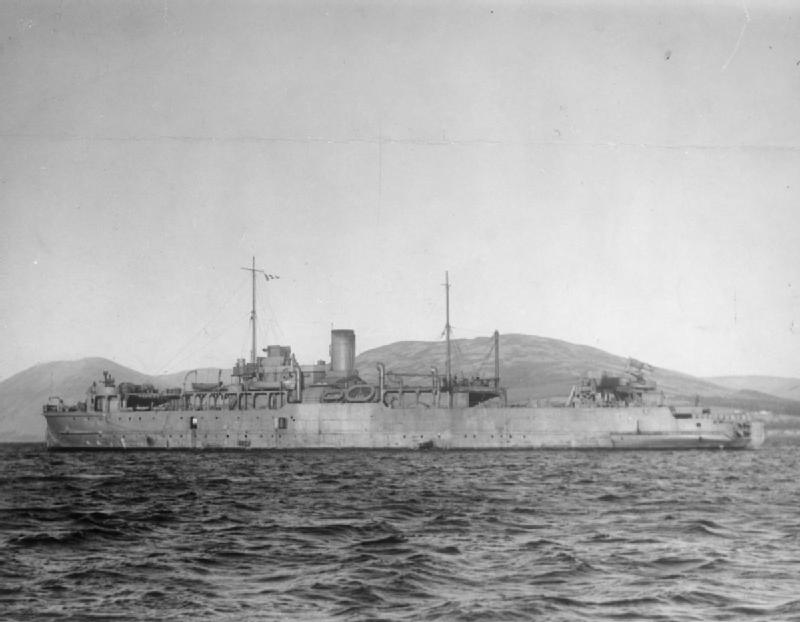
- The vessel while serving during World War II as HMS Daffodil

History
- Name: 1917–1940: TSS Train Ferry No. 3; 1940–1945: HMS Daffodil
- Operator: 1917–1924: British Army (War Office); 1924–1934: Great Eastern Railway as Great Eastern Train Ferry Company Limited; 1934–1940: London and North Eastern Railway; 1940–1945: Royal Navy
- Port of registry: (United Kingdom)
- Builder: Fairfield Shipbuilders, Govan
- Yard number: 540
- Launched: 12 September 1917
- Completed: November 1917
- Fate: Mined 18 March 1945

General characteristics
- Type: Train ferry; landing craft carrier
- Tonnage: 2,678 gross register tons (GRT)
- Length: 350 ft 6 in (106.83 m)
- Beam: 58.7 ft (17.9 m)
- Draught: 15 ft 6 in (4.72 m)
- Installed power: 410 nhp
- Propulsion: Twin triple cylinder expansion engines

TSS Train Ferry No. 3 was a roll on/roll off freight vessel built for the British War Office in 1917.

== History ==
The ship was built by Fairfield Govan and launched on 12 September 1917. Along with her sister ships SS Train Ferry No. 1 and SS Train Ferry No. 2, they were the first vessels to offer regular transport between Britain and continental Europe for rail freight vehicles. They were ordered by the British Army to provide rail freight transport from Richborough harbour to the continent to sustain the war effort. They had four sets of rails along the train deck and used a link span to load when in harbour.

On 1 February 1919 she was involved in the rescue of British and American soldiers from the American transport USS Narrangansett which had gone ashore on Bembridge Point, Isle of Wight.

After their use by the British Army ended in 1922, they were purchased by the Great Eastern Railway

The Great Eastern Railway was taken over by the London and North Eastern Railway company in 1923 with its interest in the Great Eastern Train Ferry Company. The new service was inaugurated on 24 April 1924 by Prince George, Duke of Kent.

In 1934, the Great Eastern Train Ferry Company was liquidated and she was bought by the London and North Eastern Railway.

In 1940 she was requisitioned by the Royal Navy and renamed HMS Daffodil. In 1941 she was converted to a Landing Craft carrier. She was sunk on 18 March 1945 off Dieppe in northern, France.

Approximate position of wreck

== Bibliography ==
- Anderson, Richard M. (1990). "Re: Mystery Photo No. 97". Warship International. XXVII (2): 107. ISSN 0043-0374.
- Atherton, D. (1990). "Re: Mystery Photo No. 97". Warship International. XXVII (2): 108–110. ISSN 0043-0374.
- Dittmar, Fred (1990). "Re: Mystery Photo No. 97". Warship International. XXVII (2): 107. ISSN 0043-0374.
- Heine, Paul J. (1990). "Re: Mystery Photo No. 97". Warship International. XXVII (2): 107–108. ISSN 0043-0374.
