= RMS Antwerp =

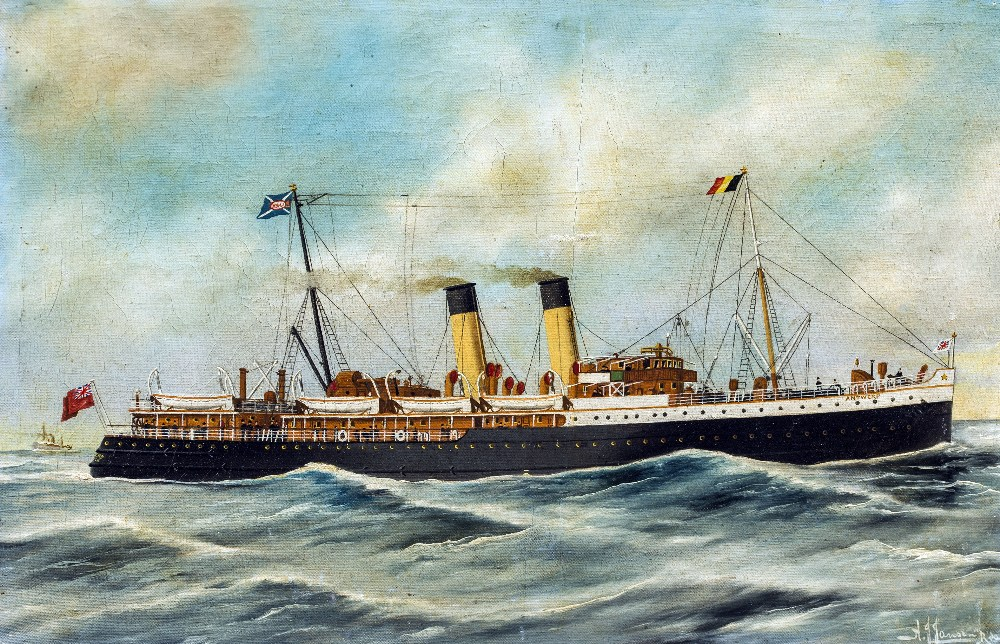
- RMS Antwerp, by A. J. Jansen

History
- Name: TSS Antwerp
- Operator: 1920–1923: Great Eastern Railway; 1923–1948: London and North Eastern Railway; 1948–1951: British Railways
- Route: Harwich to Antwerp
- Builder: John Brown, Clydebank
- Yard number: 493
- Launched: 26 October 1919
- Acquired: March 1920
- Out of service: 4 May 1951
- Fate: Scrapped 1951

General characteristics
- Tonnage: 2,957 gross register tons (GRT)
- Length: 330 feet (100 m)
- Beam: 43 feet (13 m)
- Draught: 18 feet (5.5 m)

TSS Antwerp was a passenger vessel built for the Great Eastern Railway completed in 1920.

== History ==
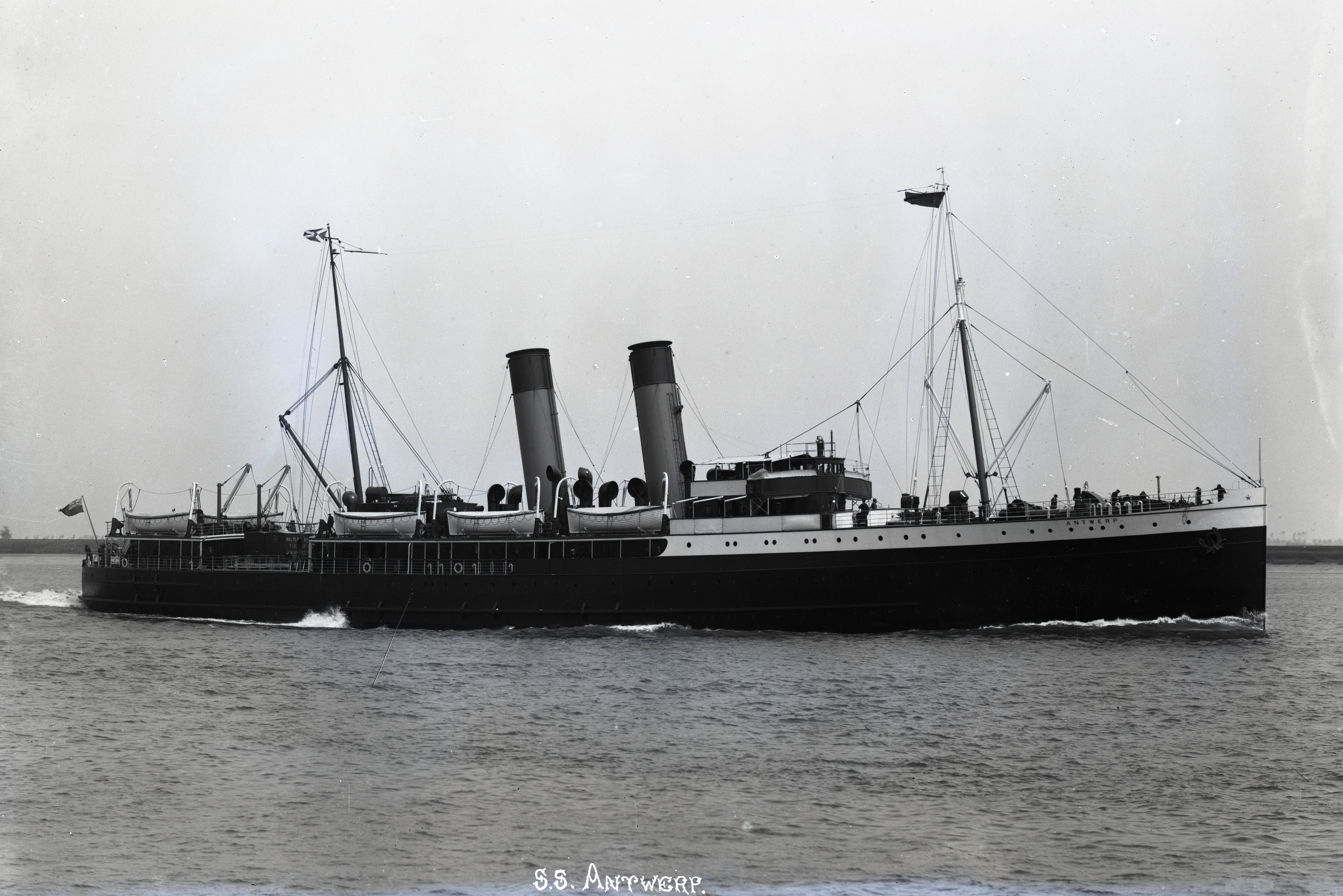
Antwerp on the river Scheldt

The ship was built by John Brown of Clydebank for the Great Eastern Railway as one of a contract for two new steamers and launched on 26 October 1919. In March 1920 she was placed on the Harwich to Antwerp route.

In 1923 she was acquired by the London and North Eastern Railway. On 20 November 1932 she collided with the American steamer Hastings in a thick fog off Zeebrugge, but was only lightly damaged, and able to continue her voyage.

She served as a Q-ship in World War I.

She was acquired by British Railways in 1948 and scrapped in 1951 at Milford Haven.
