= SS Berlin (1894) =

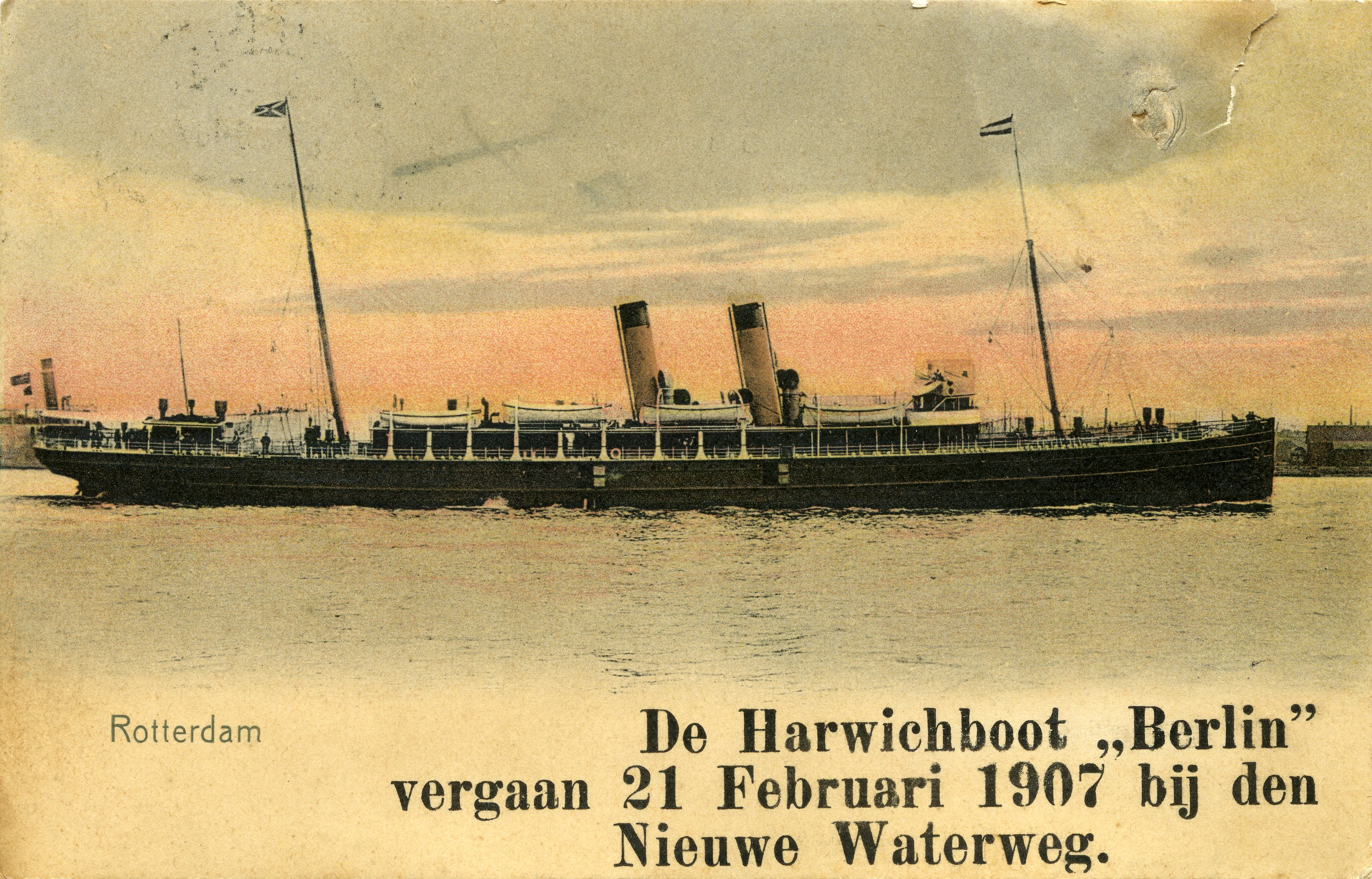
- A photo of the SS Berlin, pictured on a postcard released directly after the disaster.

History

United Kingdom
- Name: SS Berlin
- Owner: Great Eastern Railway
- Operator: Great Eastern Railway
- Route: Harwich to Hook of Holland
- Builder: Earle's Shipbuilding and Engineering Company, Hull
- Yard number: 379
- Launched: 10 January 1894
- Fate: Foundered on 21 February 1907

General characteristics
- Tonnage: 1,745 GRT
- Length: 302 ft 5 in (92.2 m)
- Beam: 36 ft 0 in (11.0 m)
- Installed power: 5,800 HP
- Propulsion: Two reciprocating steam engines
- Speed: Cruising: 15 kn (28 km/h; 17 mph)
- Capacity: Passengers: 338
- Crew: 53

Rescue of survivors from SS Berlin.

SS Berlin was a passenger vessel owned by the Great Eastern Railway and built for use on their ferry service from Harwich to the Hook of Holland.

The Great Eastern Railway ordered three steamships to operate the service. The ships were named Amsterdam, Berlin, and Vienna to publicise some of the rail connections from the Hook of Holland. Berlin was built in 1894 by Earle's Shipbuilding and Engineering Company of Hull. She had berths for 218 first- and 120 second-class passengers.

== Sinking ==
At 0500 on Thursday, 21 February 1907, the Hook lighthouse keeper recorded that Berlin was navigating the channel when she suddenly veered off course northward after a huge wave struck her on her port quarter. Captain Precious and pilot Bronders managed to return the ship to her original course, but another wave struck Berlin and she swung northward again, causing her to become impaled on the tip of the granite breakwater at the entrance to the New Waterway.

Waves swept over the vessel, and both Precious and Bronders soon were swept overboard. The Dutch steam lifeboat President van Heel attempted to offer aid, but the rough seas prevented her from approaching the stricken vessel. Berlin broke in two amidships at 0600. The majority of those on board had fled to the bow, which sank when the ship broke in half. President van Heel could not close with the survivors on the stern of the vessel due to the weather. Only one man, a Captain Parkinson who was travelling as a passenger, was able to swim to the safety of the lifeboat.

Prince Henry of the Netherlands made a visit the following day and went out on the pilot boat Helvoetsluis as Helvoetsluis and President van Heel attempted to recover the bodies from the sea and rescue the fifteen people remaining on the stern. The rescue of the people required a great deal of effort. An important role in this rescue was played by lifeboat Captain Martijn Sperling who used a small boat to reach the North Pier and ascend its iron beacon, from where he was able to throw ropes to the deck of the wreck to rescue 11 of the survivors. Captain Sperling then took a yawl from the salvage vessel Van der Tak alongside the wreck to rescue the remaining three survivors, all female.

Both Alberts Frères and the English firm the Warwick Trading Company filmed these events; their films are considered to be the only film of a current event in the Netherlands that attracted international attention in the early years of cinema.

== Aftermath ==
The correct number of persons on board the ferry at that time was apparently not immediately known. Estimates in English newspapers ranged from 128 to 180 persons on board. It is now known that 128 of 144 persons on board were killed, including about 40 crew members. The Berlin tragedy was a very large disaster for its time, and the investigation into it became the standard for later government investigations of shipping accidents, which was codified into the Dutch 1909 Schepenwet (Shipping Act).

Following the disaster, the Railway Passengers Assurance Company, Ltd., now part of Aviva, paid out £8,600, its largest single loss at the time. Of the 128 people killed, 10 were insured by the company, with three holding general accident policies and seven holding boat and rail tickets.

== Notable passengers ==
One notable passenger was Mr. Herbert, a King's Messenger travelling with diplomatic bags, including ones for Berlin, Copenhagen, and Tehran. The Tehran bag contained belongings of the Persian Prince ala-as-Saltanch: his jewelled sword and his decorations including the insignia of the Knight Grand Commander of the Royal Victorian Order. Although it is believed that Mr Herbert's body was recovered on 16 March 1907, his family asked for it to be treated as unidentified. The sword was recovered in early April 1907.

A second notable victim was Hendrik Spijker of the Spyker car company. Following his death in the sinking, investigations revealed that the company's finances were in a parlous state, leading to the company declaring bankruptcy.

William Dearborn Munroe, general manager of the Arctic Coal Company, and Lotte Wetterling, wife of the opera singer Theodor Bertram, also drowned in the wreck.

== Cultural references ==
The Dutch television program Andere Tijden showed rare film footage of the disaster on 1 March 2007.
