= London and North Eastern Railway =

British "Big 4" railway company, active 1923–1947

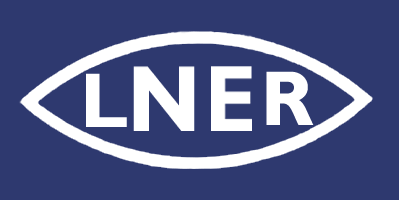

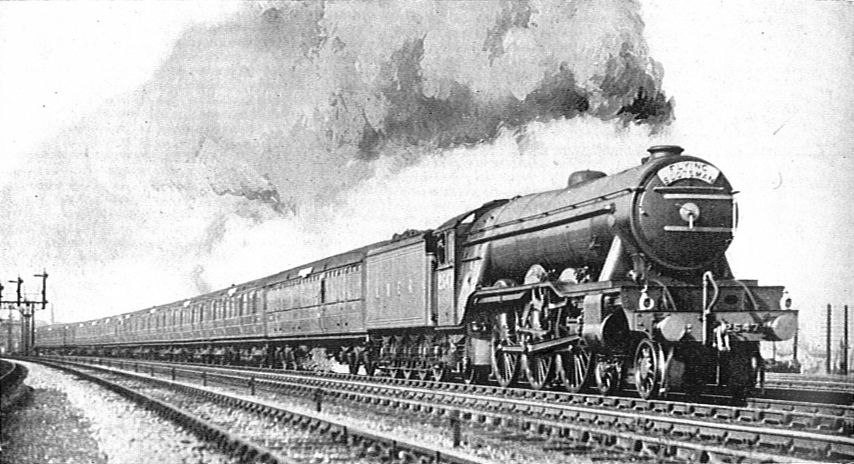
- LNER Class A1 No. 2547 Doncaster with The Flying Scotsman train in 1928.

Overview
- Locale: England; Scotland
- Dates of operation: 1 January 1923– 31 December 1947
- Predecessor: Great Eastern Railway; Great Central Railway; Great Northern Railway; Great North of Scotland Railway; Hull and Barnsley Railway; North British Railway; North Eastern Railway and others
- Successor: British Rail: Eastern Region North Eastern Region Scottish Region

Technical
- Track gauge: 4 ft 8 1/2 in (1,435 mm) standard gauge
- Length: 6,590 miles (10,610 km)

The London and North Eastern Railway (LNER) was the second largest (after LMS) of the "Big Four" railway companies created by the Railways Act 1921 in Britain. It operated from 1 January 1923 until nationalisation on 1 January 1948. At that time, it was divided into the new British Railways' Eastern Region, North Eastern Region, and partially the Scottish Region.

== History ==
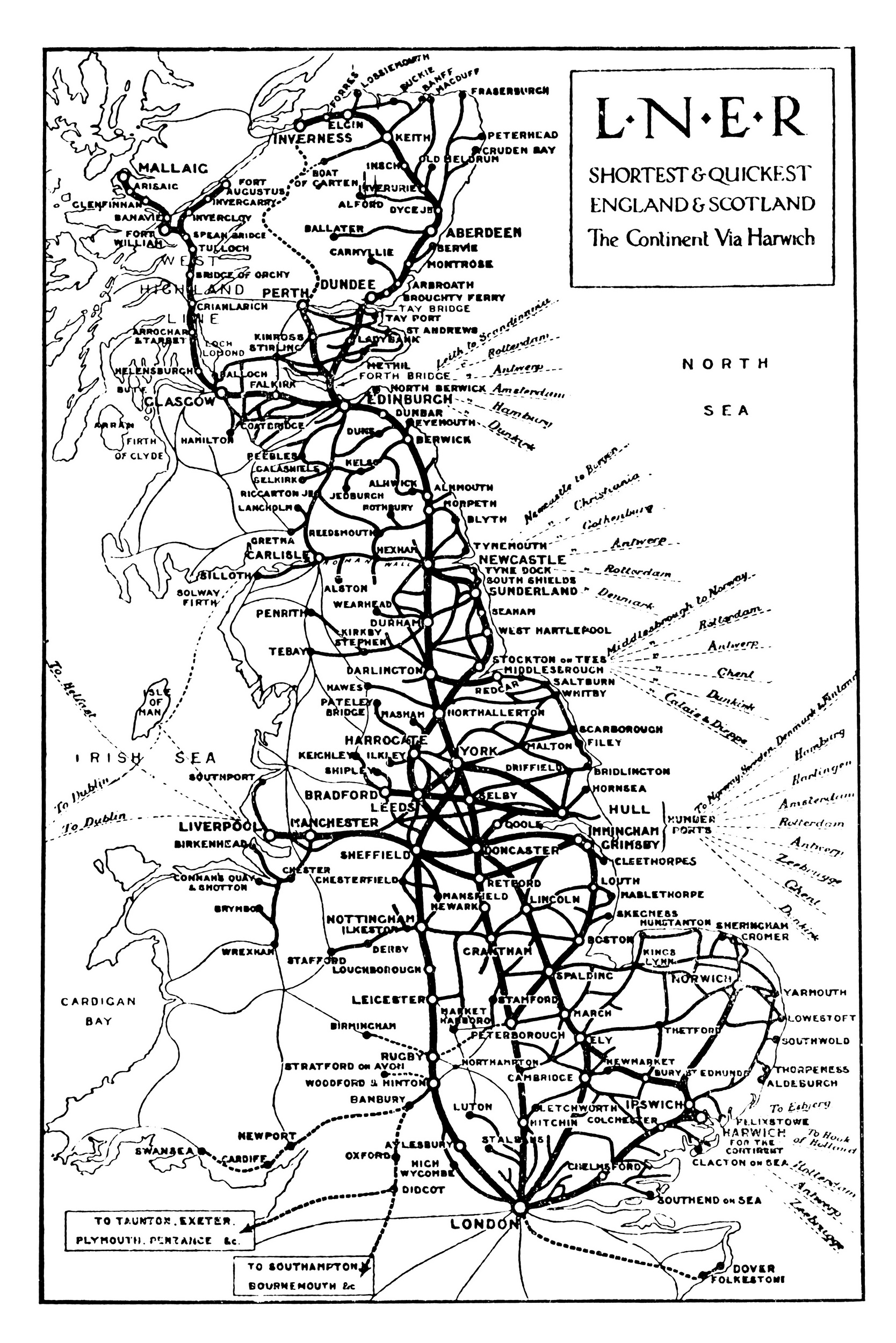
Map of the LNER system

The company was the second largest created by the Railways Act 1921. The principal constituents of the LNER were:

- Great Eastern Railway
- Great Central Railway
- Great Northern Railway
- Great North of Scotland Railway
- Hull and Barnsley Railway
- North British Railway
- North Eastern Railway

The total route mileage was 6,700 miles (10,800 km). The North Eastern Railway had the largest route mileage of 1,757 miles (2,828 km), whilst the Hull and Barnsley Railway was 106.5 miles (171.4 km). The company retained a decentralised management, with headquarters functions divided between York, Edinburgh and London. The office of the Chief General Manager was at King's Cross station and the Chairman's office was at Marylebone station.

It covered the area north and east of London. It included the East Coast Main Line from London to Edinburgh via York and Newcastle upon Tyne and the routes from Edinburgh to Aberdeen and Inverness. It also included the Great Central Main Line, from London Marylebone to Sheffield. Most of the country east of the Pennines was within its purview, including East Anglia. The main workshops were in Doncaster, with others at Darlington, Inverurie and Stratford, London.

The company also owned the most westerly track and stations in Great Britain, in the form of the West Highland Railway to Arisaig and Mallaig, previously owned by the North British Railway.

The LNER inherited four of London's termini: Fenchurch Street (ex-London and Blackwall Railway); King's Cross (ex-Great Northern Railway); Liverpool Street (ex-Great Eastern Railway); and Marylebone (ex-Great Central Railway). In addition, it ran suburban services to Broad Street (London, Midland and Scottish Railway) and Moorgate (Metropolitan Railway, later London Transport).

The LNER owned:

- 7,700 locomotives, 20,000 coaching vehicles, 29,700 freight vehicles, 140 items of electric rolling stock, 6 electric locomotives and 10 rail motor cars
- 6 turbine and 36 other steamers, and river boats and lake steamers, etc.

In partnership with the London, Midland and Scottish Railway (LMS), the LNER was co-owner of the Midland and Great Northern Joint Railway, the UK's biggest joint railway, much of which competed with the LNER's own lines. The M&GNJR was incorporated into the LNER in 1936. In 1933, on the formation of the London Passenger Transport Board, the LNER acquired the remaining operations of the Metropolitan Railway Company.

The LNER was the majority partner in the Cheshire Lines Committee and the Forth Bridge Railway Company.

It depended on freight from heavy industry in Yorkshire, the north east of England and Scotland, and its revenue was reduced by the economic depression for much of the early part of its existence. In a bid to improve financial efficiency, staffing levels reduced from 207,500 in 1924 to 175,800 in 1937. For investment to retain freight traffic, new marshalling yards were built in Whitemoor in Cambridgeshire, and Hull in Yorkshire to attempt to retain freight traffic.

Sir Ralph Wedgwood introduced a Traffic Apprenticeship Scheme to attract graduates, train young managers and provide supervision by assistant general manager Robert Bell for career planning. The company adopted a regional managerial system, with general managers based in London, York and Edinburgh, and for a short time, Aberdeen.

Timetable for Autumn 1926 detailing the resumption of services after the General Strike

For passenger services, Sir Nigel Gresley, the Chief Mechanical Engineer built new locomotives and new coaches. Later developments such as the streamlined Silver Jubilee train of 1935 were exploited by the LNER publicity department, and embedded the non-stop London to Edinburgh services such as the Flying Scotsman in the public imagination. The world record speed of 126 miles per hour (203 km/h) was achieved on a test run by LNER Class A4 4468 Mallard.

In 1929, the LNER chose the typeface Gill Sans as the standard typeface for the company. Soon it appeared on every facet of the company's identity, from metal locomotive nameplates and hand-painted station signage to printed restaurant car menus, timetables and advertising posters. The LNER promoted their rebranding by offering Eric Gill a footplate ride on the Flying Scotsman express service; he also painted for it a signboard in the style of Gill Sans, which survives in the collection of the St Bride Library. Gill Sans was retained by the Railway Executive in 1948, although modified for signage, and Gill Sans was the official typeface until British Rail replaced it in the mid 1960s with Rail Alphabet for signs and Helvetica or Univers for printed matter.

Continental shipping services were provided from Harwich Parkeston Quay.

The company took up the offer in 1933 of government loans at low interest rates and electrified the lines from Manchester to Sheffield and Wath yard, and also commuter lines in the London suburban area.

== Ancillary activities ==
The LNER inherited:

- 8 canals, including the Ashton, Chesterfield, Macclesfield, Nottingham & Grantham and Peak Forest.
- Docks and harbours in 20 locations, including Grimsby, Hartlepool, Hull, Immingham, Middlesbrough, some eastern Scottish ports, Harwich, Lowestoft and London.
- Other wharves, staithes, piers
- 2 electric tramways
- 23 hotels (20 of them were nationalised in 1948 as British Transport Hotels. Of the other three, Cruden Bay Hotel was requisitioned in 1940, Palace Hotel, Aberdeen caught fire in 1941 and the Yarborough Hotel, New Holland was sold, being advertised for sale in 1947.)
- A 49% stake in the haulage firm Mutter, Howey & Co. Ltd.

It took shares in a large number of bus companies, including for a time a majority stake in United Automobile Services Ltd. In Halifax and Sheffield, it participated in Joint Omnibus Committees with the LMS and the Corporation.

In 1935, with the LMS, Wilson Line of Hull and others it formed the shipping company Associated Humber Lines Ltd.

In 1938 it was reported that the LNER, with 800 mechanical horse tractors, was the world's largest owner of this vehicle type.

=== Ships ===
The LNER operated a number of ships, including three rail ferries. In total, 6 turbine and 36 other steamers, and river boats and lake steamers were used by the company during its existence.

== Liveries ==
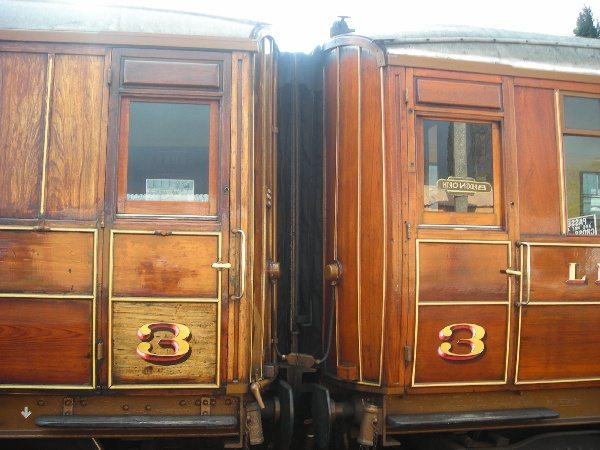
Detail of LNER teak panelled coaches, preserved on the Severn Valley Railway

The most common liveries were lined apple green on passenger locomotives (much lighter and brighter than the green used by the Great Western Railway) and unlined black on freight locomotives, both with gold lettering. Passenger carriages were generally varnished teak (wood) finish; the few metal-panelled coaches were painted to represent teak.

Some special trains and A4 Pacific locomotives were painted differently, including silver-grey and garter blue.

== Advertising ==
The LNER covered quite an extensive area of Britain, from London through East Anglia, the East Midlands and Yorkshire to the north east of England and Scotland. The 1923 grouping meant that former rivals within the LNER had to work together. The task of creating an instantly recognisable public image went to William M. Teasdale, the first advertising manager. Teasdale was influenced by the philosophies and policies of Frank Pick, who controlled the style and content of the London Underground's widely acclaimed poster advertising. Teasdale did not confine his artists within strict guidelines but allowed them a free hand. William Barribal designed a series of bold Art Deco posters in the 1920s and 1930s. When Teasdale was promoted to Assistant General Manager, this philosophy was carried on by Cecil Dandridge who succeeded him and was the Advertising Manager until nationalisation in 1948. Dandridge was largely responsible for the adoption of the Gill Sans typeface, later adopted by British Railways.

The LNER was a very industrial company: hauling more than a third of Britain's coal, it derived two thirds of its income from freight. Teasdale and Dandridge commissioned top graphic designers and poster artists such as Tom Purvis to promote its services and encourage the public to visit the holiday destinations of the east coast in the summer.

== Chief office holders ==
=== Chairmen of the Board ===
- William Whitelaw 1923 - 1938
- Sir Ronald Matthews 1938 - 1948

=== Chief General Managers ===
- Sir Ralph Wedgwood 1923 - 1939
- Charles Henry Newton 1939 - 1947
- Miles Beevor 1947 - 1948 (acting)

=== Chief mechanical engineers ===
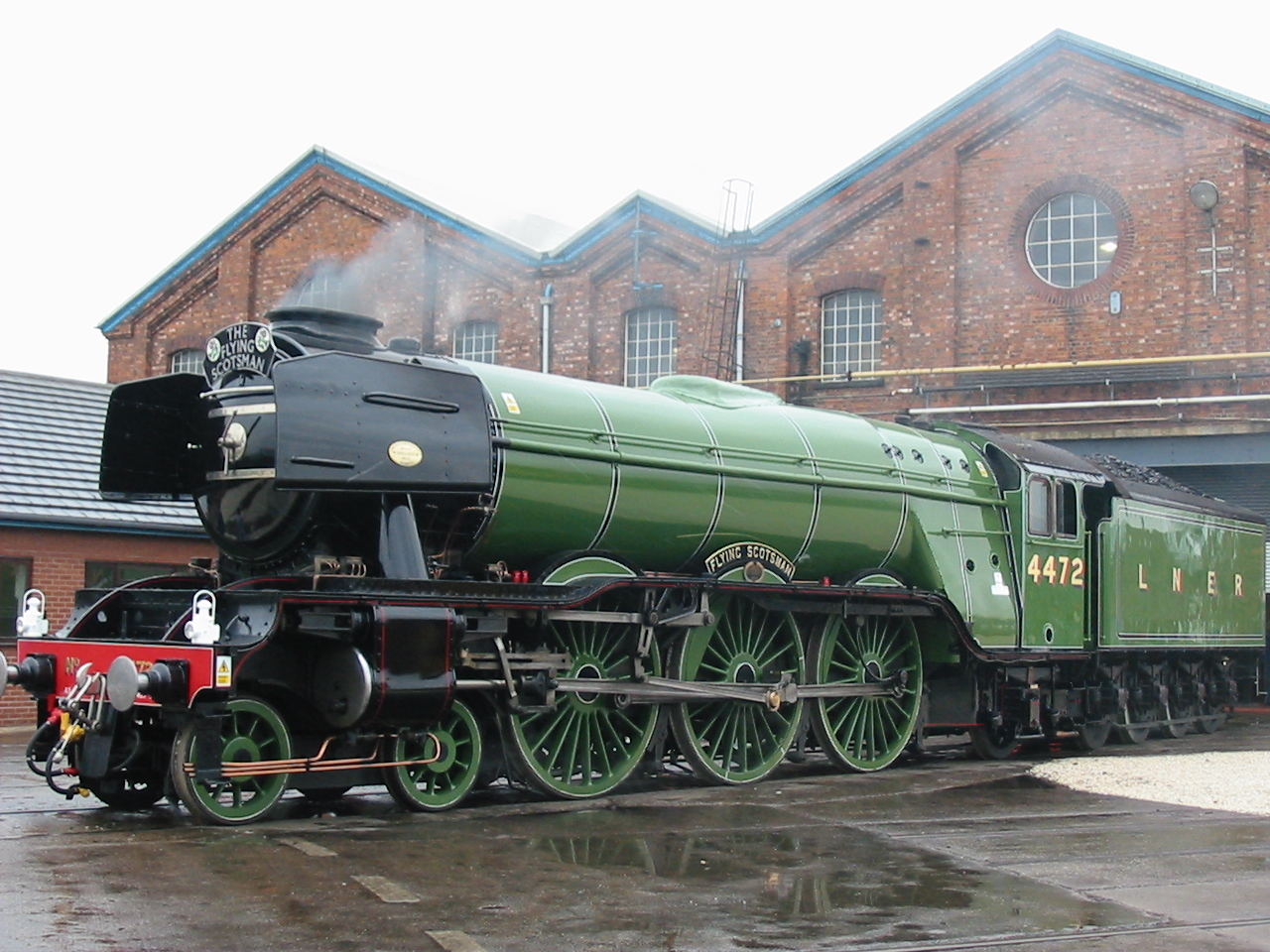
The most famous of the A1/A3 Class locomotives, A3 4472 Flying Scotsman

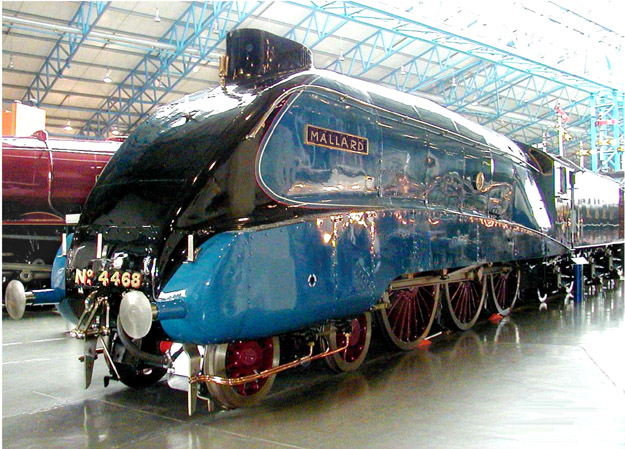
A4 Pacific Mallard, world speed record holder for steam traction

- Sir Nigel Gresley was the first CME and held the post for most of the LNER's existence, and thus he had the greatest effect on the company. He came to the LNER via the Great Northern Railway, where he was CME. He was noted for his "Big Engine" policy, and is best remembered for his large express passenger locomotives, many times the holder of the world speed record for steam locomotives. LNER Class A4 4-6-2 Pacific locomotive Mallard holds the record to this day. Gresley died in office in 1941.
- Edward Thompson's short reign (1941–1946) was a controversial one. A reputed detractor of Gresley even before his elevation to the post of CME, there are those who interpret many of his actions as being motivated by dislike of his predecessor. Thompson accepted that Gresley's designs had their flaws as well as their brilliance but still included them as part of his future locomotive stud. His record is best served by his solid and dependable freight and mixed-traffic locomotives built under and for wartime conditions. He retired in 1946.
- Arthur Peppercorn's career was cut short by nationalisation and he was CME for only 18 months. In this short period and in an atmosphere of reconstruction rather than great new endeavours, his only notable designs were the A1 and A2 Pacific express passenger locomotives, most completed after nationalisation. Peppercorn was a student and admirer of Gresley and his locomotives combined the classic lines of Gresley's with the reliability and solidity they never quite achieved.

== Nationalisation ==
The company was nationalised in 1948 along with the rest of the railway companies of Great Britain to form British Railways. It continued to exist as a legal entity for nearly two more years, being formally wound up on 23 December 1949.

On the privatisation of British Rail in 1996, the franchise to run long distance express trains on the East Coast Main Line was won by Sea Containers Ltd, who named the new operating company Great North Eastern Railway (GNER), a name and initials deliberately chosen to echo the LNER.

Following the collapse of Virgin Trains East Coast in May 2018, the newly-nationalised operator of the East Coast Main Line was named London North Eastern Railway to evoke the earlier company.

== Cultural activities ==
During the 1930s, the LNER Musical Society comprised a number of amateur male-voice choirs, based at Doncaster, Leicester, Huddersfield, Peterborough, Selby and elsewhere, which annually combined for a performance in London under their musical director Leslie Woodgate.

== Accidents ==
- On 13 February 1923, an express passenger train overran signals at Retford, Nottinghamshire and ran into the rear of a freight train. Three people were killed.
- On 23 December 1923, an express passenger train overran signals and collided with a light engine at Belford, Northumberland.
- On 28 July 1924, a passenger train overran signals and collided with another at Haymarket station, Edinburgh, Lothian. Five people were killed.
- On 12 May 1926, during the General Strike, an express passenger train was deliberately derailed south of Cramlington, Northumberland.
- On 7 August 1926, an electric multiple unit overran signals and collided with a freight train at Manors station, Newcastle upon Tyne, Northumberland. The accident was caused by the driver tying down the controller with a handkerchief. When he leant out of the train he struck an overbridge and was killed. The train continued moving until the collision.
- On 30 August 1926, an express train struck a charabanc (an open motor carriage similar to a bus) that was carrying 17 people across the tracks at a level crossing at Naworth, Cumberland due to errors by the crossing keeper, who opened the gate and waved the vehicle through despite hearing the train. A lack of interlocking between the signals and gates. Nine passengers, including a family of four were killed.
- On 14 February 1927, two passenger trains collided head-on at Hull Paragon station, Yorkshire due to a signalman's error. Twelve people were killed and 24 were injured.
- On 27 February 1927, an express passenger train collided with a light engine at Penistone, Yorkshire due to a signalman's error.
- On 17 August 1928, a passenger train struck a lorry on a level crossing at Shepreth, Cambridgeshire and derailed. The fireman, and the lorry driver, were killed.
- On 27 June 1928, an excursion train collided with a parcels train that was being shunted at Darlington, County Durham. Twenty-five people were killed and 45 were injured.
- On 9 June 1929, a steam railcar overran signals and collided with an excursion train at Marshgate Junction, Doncaster, Yorkshire.
- On 4 October 1929, a freight train departed against a danger signal at Tottenham, London, and then stopped foul of a junction where the crew abandoned the locomotive. An express passenger train collided with it and derailed.
- On 17 January 1931, a newspaper train departed from Thorpe-le-Soken station, Essex against signals and collided head-on with a light engine at Great Holland. Two people were killed and two were seriously injured.
- On 27 May 1931, a passenger train overran signals and collided head-on with another at Fakenham East station, Norfolk. One person was killed and fifteen were injured.
- On 8 September 1933, a passenger train ran into wagons at Bowling, West Dunbartonshire due to a signalman's error. Five people were injured.
- In November 1934, a Class D16/2 locomotive derailed at Wormley, Hertfordshire when it collided with a lorry on a level crossing. Both engine crew were killed.
- On 15 June 1935, an express passenger train ran into the rear of another at Welwyn Garden City, Hertfordshire due to a signalman's error. Fourteen people were killed and 29 were injured.
- On 15 February 1937, a passenger train entered a curve at excessive speed and derailed at Sleaford North Junction, Lincolnshire. Four people were killed and sixteen were injured, one seriously.
- On 15 February 1937, a freight train derailed at Upton, Sleaford due to excessive speed on a curve. The train had been diverted due to the earlier derailment.
- On 6 March 1937, a passenger train derailed at Langrick, Lincolnshire due to the poor condition of the track.
- On 13 June 1937, an excursion train overran signals and was derailed by trap points south of Durham. Nine people were injured.
- On 26 January 1939, an empty fish train (the official enquiry shows it was a passenger train) ran into the rear of a passenger train at Hatfield, Hertfordshire.
- On 1 June 1939, a passenger train collided with a lorry on an occupation crossing at Hilgay, Norfolk and was derailed.
- On 8 June 1939, a passenger train departed against a danger signal from Manchester Central station, Lancashire and collided with another passenger train. Several people were injured.
- On 10 February 1941, an express passenger train overran signals and ran into the rear of a passenger train at Harold Wood, Essex. Seven people were killed and seventeen were seriously injured.
- On 28 April 1941, a fire broke out on an express passenger train which was brought to a stand at Westborough, Lincolnshire. The rear three carriages were burnt out. Six people were killed and seven were injured. Among those killed were the two eldest children of Hubert Pierlot, the Prime Minister of the Belgian government in exile.
- On 2 June 1944, WD Austerity 2-8-0 locomotive No. 7337 was hauling a freight train which caught fire as it approached Soham, Cambridgeshire. The train comprised wagons carrying bombs. The train was divided behind the burning wagon, with the front portion being taken forward with the intention of isolating the wagon in open countryside. Its cargo detonated at Soham station, killing the fireman and the Soham signalman and injuring the trains' driver and guard. Soham station was severely damaged, but the line was re-opened within eighteen hours. For their actions, Benjamin Gimbert and James Nightall were awarded George Crosses.
- In July 1944, a passenger train was derailed at Pannal Junction by points that were half-open.
- On 5 January 1946, a freight train became divided on the East Coast Main Line in County Durham. The front section was brought to a stand but the rear section crashed into it. The wreckage fouled signal cables, giving a false clear signal to a passenger train on the opposite line which then crashed into the wreckage. Ten people were killed.
- On 10 February 1946, a passenger train crashed at Potters Bar, Hertfordshire due to a signalman's error. The wreckage fouled signal cables, giving a false clear to an express passenger train which then ran into the wreckage. A third passenger train then collided with the wreckage. Two people were killed.
- On 2 January 1947, a passenger train overran signals and ran into the rear of another at Gidea Park, Essex. Seven people were killed, 45 were hospitalised.
- On 9 August 1947, a passenger train ran into the rear of another at Darlington, County Durham due to a signalman's error. Twenty-one people were killed and 188 were injured.
- On 26 October 1947, an express passenger train entered a crossover at excessive speed and derailed at Goswick, Northumberland. Twenty-eight people were killed and 65 were injured.

== See also ==
- Coaches of the London and North Eastern Railway
- Locomotives of the London and North Eastern Railway
