= Shipping of the Lancashire and Yorkshire Railway =

The Lancashire and Yorkshire Railway (L&YR) had the largest fleet of all the pre-grouping railway companies. In 1902 the assets of the Drogheda Steam Packet Company were acquired for the sum of £80,000 (equivalent to £8,500,000 in 2025). In 1905 they took over the Goole Steam Shipping Company. By 1913 they owned 26 vessels, with another two under construction, plus a further five under joint ownership with the London and North Western Railway. The L&YR ran steamers between Liverpool and Drogheda, Hull and Zeebrugge, and between Goole and many continental ports including Amsterdam, Copenhagen, Hamburg, and Rotterdam. The jointly owned vessels provided services between Fleetwood, Belfast and Derry.

The ships operated by the L&YR were:

Ship	Launched	Tonnage (GRT)	Notes
Alt	1911	1004	Built by William Dobson and Company in Walker Yard. Transferred to L&NWR and LMS in 1922 and 1923. Scrapped in 1955.
Berlin	1891	1,090	Tonnage 1,111 according to Haws 1993. Built by Thompson of Dundee. Acquired in 1895 with the takeover of Yorkshire Coal & Steamship Co. In Copenhagen at the outbreak of war in 1914 and decision taken to leave her there for safety. However, pressure for tonnage required that she leave that port in 1916 under disguise and crossed the North Sea to Hull, where she was renamed River Ribble.
Colne	1903	875	Built by Clyde Shipbuilders at Port Glasgow for Goole-Copenhagen service of Goole Steam Shipping Company. Taken over by Lancashire and Yorkshire Railway in 1905. Sank on passage from Goole to Rotterdam on 11 March 1906 off the West Maas Lightvessel.
Dearne	1909	984	Built By Swan Hunter & Wigham Richardson at Newcastle, the first of ten sister vessels. Served mainly on Hamburg route and was in Hamburg at the outbreak of war. Vessel seized by Germany and was torpedoed on 22 December 1915 and sunk whilst in German commercial service.
Don	1892	939	Built by W. Dobson, a sister of "Hebble" for Goole Steam Shipping's Ghent service. Transferred to Lancashire and Yorkshire Railway service in 1905. Torpedoed and sunk whilst on a ballast passage from Cromarty to Blyth on 8 May 1915.
Douglas	1907	950	Built by Clyde Shipbuilding and Engineering in Port Glasgow for Goole Steam Shipping's Copenhagen service. Known as one of the 'butter boats' with her white hull. Transferred to L&NWR in 1922 and LMS in 1923 and again in 1935 to Associated Humber Lines. By this time she had her hull colour changed to black. Sold in 1937 to Stanhope S.S. Co and renamed "Stanhope" and later the same year to G M Mavroleon, Greece and renamed Nepheligeretis. Sold in 1938 to B Athanassiades and renamed Hermes then Suzy. Renamed Ioanna in 1940. Sunk on 1 June 1940 by gunfire from a U-boat off Cape Finisterre. The logic of the particular attack was never explained.
Equity	1888	918	Built By Earle's of Hull for Goole Steam Shipping and one of three ships bought from Co-Operative Wholesale Society in 1906. She had been lengthened in 1900 with a revised tonnage of 931 and had been employed on the Goole – Hamburg service. She was captured in Hamburg in 1914 and was returned to her owners in 1918 having spent the war period mainly serving traffic to Finland from Germany. In 1921 whilst on passage from Jersey to Goole on the 'potato trade' she grounded and sank but was later salved. She transferred to L&NWR and LMS in 1922 and 1923 respectively. She again grounded at Alderney in June 1930, but despite being partially swamped she was salved again. She was eventually scrapped in December 1931 at Greenock.
Hebble	1891	904	Built by W. Dobson for Goole Steam Shipping's Goole – Ghent service. Transferred to Lancashire and Yorkshire Railway in 1905. Mined and sunk on 6 May 1917 whilst on passage from Newhaven to Rouen with military supplies.
Hodder	1910	1,016	Sister of Dearne (1909). Built by Wm. Dobson at Sunderland for the Hamburg route. Was converted into a cable layer in 1915 for the Post Office and was based at Scapa Flow from where she carried out vital cable laying around the Orkney and Shetland Islands. Joined the L & N.W.R fleet in 1922 and the L.M.S in 1923 before transfer to Associated Humber Lines in 1935. Transferred to Holyhead – Dublin route in 1946 and finally scrapped in November 1956 at Dunston.
Humber	1903	1,023	Built by A. McMillan and Co of Dumbarton for Goole Steam Shipping's Copenhagen service. Was taken over by Lancashire and Yorkshire Railway in 1905. She collided with and sank the German steamer Modena owned by Robert M Sloman Jr. in 1910; but was sunk herself on 12 February 1912 after a collision with SS Answald of the Hamburg Bremer – Afrika Linie off the Elbe No.1 Lightvessel.
Irwell	1906	1,092	Tonnage 1,040 according to Haws 1993. Built by Swan Hunter & Wigham Richardson for the Goole-Rotterdam service with her sister Mersey. Transferred to L&NWR and LMS in 1922 and 1923 respectively, and on to Associated Humber Lines in 1935. Was based in Icelandic waters as a Naval supply ship in World War II. In 1946 switched to Larne-Loch Ryan service and finally scrapped in March 1954 at Gateshead.
Liberty	1900	895	Built by Earle's of Hull in 1890 according to Haws 1993. The sister of Equity also bought from Co-Operative Wholesale Society in 1906. Transferred to L&NWR and LMS in 1922 and 1923. Scrapped at Sunderland in December 1931.
Mersey	1906	1,087	Tonnage 1,037 according to Haws 1993. Built at Swan Hunter & Wigham Richardson. Entered service from Goole to Rotterdam. In 1915 switched to GWR's Weymouth – Channel Isles service. Converted with Hodder to a cable layer in 1917 and was released back to her owners in 1920. Transferred to L&NWR, LMS and AHL in 1922, 1923 and 1935 respectively. Hit a mine on 20 February 1940 and sunk in the English Channel with a loss of 14 lives.
Nidd	1900	996	Built by Wm. Dobson for service on the Antwerp route and transferred to L and Y in 1905. Served in both cross-channel and in the Mediterranean during war period, returning to her owners Antwerp service in 1919. Chartered to Great Western Railway in 1932 for Weymouth – Jersey trade. Scrapped in 1933 at Mostyn.
Rawcliffe	1906	866	Built by John Crown and Sons at Sunderland. Bought from Wetherall Steamship Co in 1906. Transferred to L&NWR and LMS in 1922 and 1923. Scrapped at Bo'ness in December 1931.
Ouse	1911	1004	Built by William Dobson and Company in Walker Yard. Transferred to L&NWR and LMS in 1922 and 1923. Sunk on 8 August 1940.
River Ribble	1891	1,090	Renamed in 1916 from Berlin. Sold to J.J. King of Garston and scrapped in September 1933 at Gateshead.
Saltmarshe	1907	930	A sister of Rawcliffe except built at Wm. Pickersgill and Co., in Sunderland. Had very similar history to her sister being purchased from Wetherall. Scrapped at Bo'ness in December 1931.
Spen	1908	900	Built by Wm. Dobson. Used by the Admiralty 1914–1918 for cross-channel service out of Newhaven. To L.& N.W.R in 1922 and L.M.S. in 1923. Scrapped in September 1933 at Middlesbrough.
Unity	1902	1,091	The third vessel bought from Co-Operative Wholesale Society in 1906 having been built at Murdoch and Murray in Port Glasgow. Served on the Goole – Hamburg route. Having avoided a torpedo attack which sank another vessel from the line in April 1918, she was torpedoed on 2 May 1918 by UB-57 and sunk south-east of Folkestone.

Ships jointly operated with the London and North Western Railway

Ship	Launched	Tonnage (GRT)	Notes and references
Colleen Bawn	1903	1,204	Relegated to cargo service in 1914. Scrapped in 1931.
Duke of Albany	1907	2,259	Requisitioned by the Royal Navy as HMS Duke of Albany, an Armed Boarding Vessel. Torpedoed and sunk in 1916.
Duke of Argyll	1909	2,052	Sold in 1927 to Angleterre-Lorraine-Alsace and renamed Alsace. Scrapped in 1937 at Altenwerder, Germany.
Duke of Clarence	1892	1,458	Requisitioned by the Admiralty in 1914, returned to LNWR in 1920. Scrapped in 1930.
Duke of Connaught	1875	1,082	Built by Barrow Shipbuilding Company. Scrapped in 1893
Duke of Connaught	1902	1,680	Scrapped in 1934.
Duke of Cornwall	1898	1,540	Sold in 1928 to Isle of Man Steam Packet Company, renamed Rushen Castle. Scrapped in 1948.
Duke of Cumberland	1909	2,052	Sold in 1927 to Angleterre-Lorraine-Alsace, renamed Picard. Sold in 1936 to A Anghelatos, Greece and renamed Heliopolis. Scrapped at Genoa, Italy in 1939.
Duke of Lancaster	1895	1,520	Sold to Isle of Man Steam Packet Company in 1912, renamed The Ramsey. Requisitioned by the Royal Navy in 1914. Sunk in August 1915 by SMS Meteor.
Duke of York	1894	1,473	Sold to Isle of Man Steam Packet Company in 1912 and renamed Peel Castle. Sold in 1930. Scrapped in 1939 at Dalmuir, West Dunbartonshire.
Earl of Ulster	1878	1,107	Sold in 1894 to Harland & Wolff
Iverna	1895	995	Acquired with the takeover of Drogheda Steam Packet Company in 1902. Scrapped in 1912.
Kathleen Mavourneen	1885	988	Acquired with the takeover of Drogheda Steam Packet Company in 1902. Scrapped in 1903.
Lune	1892	253	Used for pleasure trips to Blackpool and Morecambe. Sold to Cosens & Co Ltd in 1913, renamed Melcombe Regis. Scrapped in 1920.
Mellifont	1903	1,204	Scrapped in 1933
Norah Creina	1878	894	Acquired with the takeover of Drogheda Steam Packet Company in 1902. Scrapped in 1912.
Prince Arthur	1864	708	Built as Alfred for Bristol Steam Navigation Co. Was renamed Old Dominion when sold for use as a US Confederate blockade runner within weeks of being completed. Vessel returned to UK in 1865 and was renamed Sheffield when purchased by Liverpool & Dublin Steam Navigation Co Ltd. Further renaming in 1869 as Prince Arthur and was taken over by the joint railway operators in 1870. Sold in 1877 to T Seed Ltd, Fleetwood.
Prince of Wales	1886	1,429>	Sold in 1896 to Spain.
Princess of Wales	1870	936	Built by Andrew Leslie and Co. at Hebburn-on-Tyne and was re-engined in 1882-3 (a repeat of Thomas Dugdale). Sold to Naval Construction & Armaments Ltd., of Barrow and broken up in 1896.
Royal Consort	1844	522	Built in 1844 for North Lancashire Steam Navigation Co Ltd. Bought in 1870, scrapped in 1893.
Thomas Dugdale	1873	1,000	Built by Andrew Leslie and Co. at Hebburn-on-Tyne. Re-engined in 1882. Sold in 1888 to Irish National Steamship Co Ltd. Purchased by Laird's of Glasgow in 1890 and renamed Laurel eventually being broken up in 1893.
Tredagh	1876	901	Acquired with the takeover of Drogheda Steam Packet Company in 1902. Scrapped in 1904.

== Bibliography ==
- Haws, Duncan (1993). Merchant Fleets – Britain's Railway Steamers – Eastern & North Western + Zeeland and Stena. Hereford: TCL Publications. ISBN 978-0-946378-22-7.
