= List of shipwrecks in 1931 =

The list of shipwrecks in 1931 includes ships sunk, foundered, grounded, or otherwise lost during 1931.

table of contents
1931
Jan	Feb	Mar	Apr
May	Jun	Jul	Aug
Sep	Oct	Nov	Dec
Unknown date

== January ==
=== 1 January ===
List of shipwrecks: 1 January 1931
Ship	State	Description
John W. Miller	Canada	The schooner was abandoned in the Atlantic Ocean (33°41′N 36°14′W). The crew were rescued by Wibo (Germany).

=== 2 January ===
List of shipwrecks: 2 January 1931
Ship	State	Description
Fotini Carras	Greece	The cargo ship ran aground south of Fontana. She was refloated on 5 February.
Hesperos	Norway	The cargo ship ran aground at Karelina Bougaz, Soviet Union. She was refloated on 5 January.

=== 5 January ===
List of shipwrecks: 5 January 1931
Ship	State	Description
Raritan	United States	The dredger collided with City of Montgomery (United States)
Tricolor	Norway	The cargo liner caught fire, exploded and sank in the Indian Ocean 5 nautical miles (9.3 km) off Barberyn, Ceylon with the loss of four lives. Survivors were rescued by Porthos (France).

=== 6 January ===
List of shipwrecks: 6 January 1931
Ship	State	Description
Fleurus	Norway	The cargo ship ran aground on West Falkland, Falkland Islands. She was refloated on 18 January.
Nurtureton	United Kingdom	The cargo ship came ashore at Lade, Kent and broke her back. She was abandoned as a total loss on 12 January. The stern section was towed to Gravesend, Kent, arriving on 4 February. The bow section arrived on 20 February. She was subsequently repaired and returned to service.

=== 7 January ===
List of shipwrecks: 7 January 1931
Ship	State	Description
Carl	Germany	The cargo ship collided with Themis (Sweden) off Swinemünde, Pomerania and sank.
Hercules	United Kingdom	The tug collided with Napier Star (United Kingdom) and sank in the River Tyne at Newcastle-upon-Tyne, Northumberland with the loss of three crew.

=== 10 January ===
List of shipwrecks: 10 January 1931
Ship	State	Description
Cesar	Spain	The cargo ship foundered off Cape Peñas, Asturias.
Werdenfels	Germany	The cargo ship came ashore 16 nautical miles (30 km) south of Okha Port, India. She was refloated on 15 January.

=== 12 January ===
List of shipwrecks: 12 January 1931
Ship	State	Description
Barbara	Germany	The auxiliary galeas was driven ashore at Arnager, Denmark. The crew were rescued.
Hakutetsu Maru No.2	Japan	The cargo ship ran aground 25 nautical miles (46 km) west of Moji. She sank the next day.

=== 13 January ===
List of shipwrecks: 13 January 1931
Ship	State	Description
Crown of Denmark	United Kingdom	The auxiliary schooner came ashore at Portland, Dorset and was wrecked. The crew were rescued by Portwey (United Kingdom).
Hanseat	Germany	The fishing trawler sank at Bremerhaven. She was refloated on 15 January.

=== 17 January ===
List of shipwrecks: 17 January 1931
Ship	State	Description
Steingrim	Norway	The cargo ship ran aground at Vyborg, Finland. She was refloated on 11 February.

=== 18 January ===
List of shipwrecks: 18 January 1931
Ship	State	Description
Kabinda	Belgium	The cargo ship ran aground on Mafia Island, Tanganyika. She was refloated on 4 February.
Tatra	Hungary	The cargo ship was abandoned in the Aegean Sea off Serifos (37°07′N 24°25′E), where she drifted ashore.
Vesuvio	Italy	The barquentine came ashore as Scilla, Calabria and was wrecked. The crew were rescued.

=== 19 January ===
List of shipwrecks: 19 January 1931
Ship	State	Description
Baron de Catelin	Belgium	The cargo ship was driven ashore at Zonguldak, Turkey and sank.

=== 20 January ===
List of shipwrecks: 20 January 1931
Ship	State	Description
Lindisfarne	United Kingdom	The cargo ship collided with Tancred (Norway) in the Nieuwe Waterweg between Schiedam and Vlaardingen, South Holland, Netherlands and was beached.
Sirius	United Kingdom	The cargo ship collided with Otava (Finland) in the River Thames at Charlton, London and was beached.

=== 22 January ===
List of shipwrecks: 22 January 1931
Ship	State	Description
Commercial Mariner	United States	The cargo ship collided with San Simeon (United States) at Philadelphia, Pennsylvania and sank.
Glenarch	United Kingdom	The cargo ship ran aground at the Inishmore Lighthouse, County Galway, Ireland. She was refloated on 5 February.
Zavaslia	Soviet Union	The ship foundered in the Black Sea with the loss of all 50 people on board.

=== 23 January ===
List of shipwrecks: 23 January 1931
Ship	State	Description
Frank M	United Kingdom	The cargo ship collided with the motor barge Louis Ghemor 7 (Belgium) in the Scheldt at Tamise, Belgium, and was beached.

=== 25 January ===
List of shipwrecks: 25 January 1931
Ship	State	Description
Hato Maru	Japan	The cargo ship ran aground on the Korean coast and sank.

=== 26 January ===
List of shipwrecks: 26 January 1931
Ship	State	Description
Drina	Yugoslavia	The cargo ship ran aground on Pearl Rock, Gibraltar. She was declared a total loss.
Gleneden	United Kingdom	The cargo ship ran aground at Ras Fatma, Italian Eritrea. She was refloated on 30 January.

=== 27 January ===
List of shipwrecks: 27 January 1931
Ship	State	Description
Enton	United Kingdom	The cargo ship ran aground on a reef off New Caledonia (22°50′S 176°45′E). She was declared a total loss.

=== 30 January ===
List of shipwrecks: 30 January 1931
Ship	State	Description
Enterprise II	United Kingdom	The tug sank at Preston, Lancashire.

=== 31 January ===
List of shipwrecks: 31 January 1931
Ship	State	Description
Dancho Maru	Japan	The cargo ship ran aground and sank off Wakayama.
Elise	Germany	The auxiliary sailing vessel was struck by Teal (United Kingdom) at Hamburg and sank.

=== Unknown date ===
List of shipwrecks: Unknown date 1931
Ship	State	Description
Yesil Irmak	Turkey	The cargo ship ran aground at Zonguldak. She was refloated on 20 September.

== February ==
=== 1 February ===
List of shipwrecks: 1 February 1931
Ship	State	Description
Arabia Maru	Japan	The cargo ship collided with Takao Maru (Japan) in Tokyo Bay off Kannonzaki Lighthouse and was beached on muddy sand off Onuki Town, Chiba Prefecture. She was refloated on 5 or 6 February. Repaired and returned to service.

=== 2 February ===
List of shipwrecks: 2 February 1931
Ship	State	Description
Valvanera	Spain	The cargo ship was beached at Saint-Jean-de-Luz, Basses-Pyrénées, France.

=== 5 February ===
List of shipwrecks: 5 February 1931
Ship	State	Description
Gardelaki	Greece	The cargo ship ran aground north east of Sulaki. She was refloated on 18 February.
Ichang	China	The ship collided with another vessel in the Yangtze and was beached downstream of Tungchow.

=== 6 February ===
List of shipwrecks: 6 February 1931
Ship	State	Description
Chofuku Maru	Japan	The cargo ship ran aground on a reef at Point Cloates, Western Australia about three or four miles (4.8 or 6.4 km) north of the North West Whaling Station whilst going to the aid of Shunsei Maru (Japan), and about one mile (1.6 km) from Shunsei Maru. Her coal bunkers caught fire the next day destroying most of her superstructure. Salvagers salvaged equipment and anchors. The wreck eventually keeled over and sank.
Golden Rod	United States	The cargo ship ran aground at the mouth of the Fraser River, British Columbia, Canada. She was refloated the next day and returned to service.
Mado	United Kingdom	The tug sank in the River Thames at Canning Town, London.
Shunsei Maru	Japan	The cargo ship ran aground on a reef at Point Cloates about three or four miles (4.8 or 6.4 km) north of the North West Whaling Station. Salvagers, using her equipment, refloated her on 5 April. She was taken to Carnarvon, Western Australia for temporary repairs and steamed under her own power to Surabaya, Netherlands East Indies for permanent repairs.

=== 7 February ===
List of shipwrecks: 7 February 1931
Ship	State	Description
Sumner	United States	After striking a submerged object with great force 1 nautical mile (1.9 km; 1.2 mi) off Davidson Point (54.9333333°N 132.4°W), the 11-gross register ton, 46.7-foot (14.2 m) fishing vessel caught fire and sank in approximately 600 feet (180 m) of water 3 nautical miles (5.6 km; 3.5 mi) north-northwest of Point Percy (54°56′50″N 131°37′00″W) in Southeast Alaska. The only person on board escaped in a lifeboat and survived.

=== 10 February ===
List of shipwrecks: 10 February 1931
Ship	State	Description
Daliu Maru	Japan	The cargo ship collided with a tug at Shibauru and was beached.
Kikusui Maru	Japan	The passenger ship collided with Porthos (France) at Kobe and sank with the loss of twenty lives.

=== 12 February ===
List of shipwrecks: 12 February 1931
Ship	State	Description
Leo le Blanc	United Kingdom	The schooner came ashore on Grand Turk Island and was wrecked.
Penobscot	United States	The tug was destroyed by fire at Bucksport, Maine.

=== 13 February ===
List of shipwrecks: 13 February 1931
Ship	State	Description
Nereus	United Kingdom	The dredger foundered off Tamar Heads, Tasmania, Australia with the loss of two crew.

=== 14 February ===
List of shipwrecks: 14 February 1931
Ship	State	Description
Malve	Finland	The 251-foot (77 m), 2,412-ton cargo ship went aground on Tiree in a gale with snow. She was refloated and anchored in Balephetrish Bay, but dragged anchor and was wrecked in a gale in Balephetrish Bay, Tiree Island, Hebrides, the next day, (56°31′N 06°52′W) a total loss.

=== 17 February ===
List of shipwrecks: 17 February 1931
Ship	State	Description
Hallmoor	United Kingdom	The cargo ship was driven ashore on the Pin Cushion Rocks in the North Sea off Sunderland, Co Durham. She was refloated on 21 February.

=== 18 February ===
List of shipwrecks: 18 February 1931
Ship	State	Description
Captain Rokos	Greece	The cargo ship ran aground on Anegada, British Virgin Islands. She was abandoned as a total loss on 20 February.
Leander	Germany	The coaster caught fire off Kolka, Latvia and was abandoned by her crew.
HMAS Pioneer	Royal Australian Navy	The decommissioned Pelorus-class cruiser was scuttled in the Tasman Sea off Sydney Heads, Australia.

=== 19 February ===
List of shipwrecks: 19 February 1931
Ship	State	Description
Diana	Norway	The cargo ship collided with Alferrarede (Portugal) off Cuxhaven, Germany, and was beached.
Julia	United Kingdom	The schooner was wrecked on the Arklow Banks, Irish Sea with the loss of all five crew.
Theotokos	Greece	The cargo ship collided with P.L.M. 14 (France) off the Longships Lightship (United Kingdom). All 29 crew survived.

=== 21 February ===
List of shipwrecks: 21 February 1931
Ship	State	Description
Krawang	flag unknown	The dredger sank at Rotterdam, South Holland, Netherlands.

=== 22 February ===
List of shipwrecks: 22 February 1931
Ship	State	Description
Kurland	Germany	The cargo ship sank in the North Sea 15 nautical miles (28 km) north west of the Terschelling Lightship (Netherlands). The crew survived.
Sea Foam	United States	The coaster came ashore 120 nautical miles (220 km) north of San Francisco, California and was wrecked. The crew were rescued.
Volos	Germany	The cargo ship ran aground on the Lephari Rocks, Skiathos. She was abandoned as a total loss on 16 March.

=== 24 February ===
List of shipwrecks: 24 February 1931
Ship	State	Description
Solfrid	Sweden	The coaster ran aground in the Menai Strait at Caernarfon, United Kingdom. She was refloated on 2 March.

=== 25 February ===
List of shipwrecks: 25 February 1931
Ship	State	Description
Agiena II	Netherlands	The cargo ship ran aground north of Rønne, Denmark and was abandoned.
Benmohr	United Kingdom	The cargo ship ran aground at Prawle Point, Devon. All 49 crew were taken off by Restorer (United Kingdom) via breeches buoy or landed on shore using rocket apparatus.
Mumbles	United Kingdom	The tug came ashore at Oxwich Point, Glamorgan. The crew were rescued.
Trevean	United Kingdom	The cargo ship ran aground in the Black Sea east of the entrance to the Bosporus. She broke in two and sank. All 36 crew were rescued by Raila (Norway). She was refloated on 23 May.
Wellfield	United Kingdom	The tanker ran aground in the Black Sea near the entrance to the Bosporus and was wrecked. All crew survived. She was refloated on 6 May.

=== 26 February ===
List of shipwrecks: 26 February 1931
Ship	State	Description
Ceres	Germany	The cargo ship ran aground in the Black Sea 4 nautical miles (7.4 km) east of the entrance to the Bosporus. She was refloated on 10 March.
Teceliadalet	Turkey	The cargo ship was driven ashore at Şile. She broke in two on 28 February and was abandoned as a total loss.

=== 27 February ===
List of shipwrecks: 27 February 1931
Ship	State	Description
Maria Grazia	Italy	The coaster caught fire in the Mediterranean Sea 60 nautical miles (110 km) south of Capri, Italy (approximately 40°N 14°E) and was abandoned.

=== 28 February ===
List of shipwrecks: 28 February 1931
Ship	State	Description
Comercio Luarca	Spain	The coaster foundered off Cabo Peñas, Asturias with the loss of six of her seven crew. The survivor was rescued by Alzkori Mendi (Spain).
Mena	Polish Navy	The minesweeper was driven against the quayside at Gdynia, Pomeranian Voivodeship and sank.

=== Unknown date ===
List of shipwrecks: Unknown date 1931
Ship	State	Description
Kurtland	Germany	The cargo ship foundered in the North Sea following an onboard explosion. Twelve crew were rescued by the trawler Chikara (United Kingdom) and landed at Grimsby, Lincolnshire on 28 February.

== March ==
=== 1 March ===
List of shipwrecks: 1 March 1931
Ship	State	Description
Hannah E Reynolds	United Kingdom	The 120.7-foot (36.8 m), 253-ton trawler went aground on rocks at Bow Head, Aikerness, Westray, in a blinding snowstorm. Later heavy seas washed her off the rocks only to go ashore on rocks again. The crew was then rescued with lines. Refloated on 5 March. She was repaired and returned to service.
John Manning	United Kingdom	The auxiliary three-masted schooner foundered 100 nautical miles (190 km) south east of the Ambrose Channel.

=== 5 March ===
List of shipwrecks: 5 March 1931
Ship	State	Description
Emerett	United States	The schooner sprang a leak in the Atlantic Ocean and was abandoned by her crew. She was sighted by Sea Thrush (United States) at 31°45′N 73°20′W.

=== 6 March ===
List of shipwrecks: 6 March 1931
Ship	State	Description
Hsin Chang	China	The passenger ship ran aground in the Elliot Islands. The passengers and some of the crew were taken off.
Prince Rupert	Canada	The passenger ship was undergoing an annual refit at Yarrows in Victoria, British Columbia, Canada, when water leaking into her hold caused her to list 45 degrees and sink alongside a pier in 26 feet (7.9 m) of water. She was refloated, repaired, and returned to service.
Yawata Maru	Japan	The cargo ship ran aground at Ōshima, Fukuoka. She was refloated on 9 March.

=== 7 March ===
List of shipwrecks: 7 March 1931
Ship	State	Description
USCGC CG-111	United States Coast Guard	The cutter was destroyed by a fire.
Roseville	Norway	The cargo ship ran aground on Kiushan Tao, China. She was refloated on 11 June.

=== 8 March ===
List of shipwrecks: 8 March 1931
Ship	State	Description
Tern	United Kingdom	The coaster collided with City of Malines (United Kingdom) in the North Sea off the Hull Lightship (United Kingdom) and sank. The seventeen crew were rescued by the pilot cutter J. H. Fisher.

=== 9 March ===
List of shipwrecks: 9 March 1931
Ship	State	Description
Warons	Latvia	The schooner ran aground on Salt Island Point, Holyhead, Anglesey, United Kingdom and was wrecked.

=== 11 March ===
List of shipwrecks: 11 March 1931
Ship	State	Description
Ta Chi	China	The cargo liner caught fire in the Yangtze 80 nautical miles (150 km) upstream of Woosung. She was beached, but about 300 of the approximately 500 people were killed. Chuentiao (Chinese Navy) and Taho (China) rescued 183 people between them. Ta Chi was a total loss.

=== 13 March ===
List of shipwrecks: 13 March 1931
Ship	State	Description
Cormoran	Netherlands	The coaster struck a submerged wreck in Kiel Bay and was beached.

=== 14 March ===
List of shipwrecks: 14 March 1931
Ship	State	Description
Britannia	United States	The tug collided with Coahoma County (United States) at New York and sank.

=== 15 March ===
List of shipwrecks: 15 March 1931
Ship	State	Description
Viking	Canada	The whaler exploded and sank off Horse Islands. Twenty seven of her crew were killed.

=== 16 March ===
List of shipwrecks: 16 March 1931
Ship	State	Description
Andreas K	Greece	The cargo ship ran aground at Kilias Point, Turkey. She was refloated on 23 March.
Chang Kiang	France	The cargo ship ran aground on the Heihan Islands and was a total loss.
Shinsei Maru No.6	Japan	The cargo ship ran aground on Hainan Bluff, China. She was still aground on 28 March.

=== 17 March ===
List of shipwrecks: 17 March 1931
Ship	State	Description
Citrine	United Kingdom	The coaster struck rocks at Bradda Head, Port Erin, Isle of Man and sank with the loss of nine of her eleven crew.

=== 19 March ===
List of shipwrecks: 19 March 1931
Ship	State	Description
Hera	Norway	The cargoliner ran aground at Havøygavlen, Norway, and sank with the loss of seven crew.
Pet	United Kingdom	The schooner came ashore at Bruns Ness, Caithness. Her crew were rescued by lifeboat.

=== 20 March ===
List of shipwrecks: 20 March 1931
Ship	State	Description
Sir William	United Kingdom	The schooner became trapped in ice off Horse Islands, Newfoundland. She was set on fire and abandoned by her crew, who were rescued by Eagle (United Kingdom).

=== 21 March ===
List of shipwrecks: 21 March 1931
Ship	State	Description
Montclare	United Kingdom	The ocean liner ran aground on Little Cumbrae, Ayrshire. Approximately 300 passengers were taken off by the ship's lifeboats. She was refloated the next day.
Monroe	United States	Carrying a cargo of 20 tons of salt, barrels. and tierces, the 34-gross register ton motor vessel dragged her anchor during a gale and snowstorm and was wrecked on a reef off the southeast point of Wingham Island (59°59′45″N 144°22′10″W) on the south-central coast of the Territory of Alaska. Her crew of two survived by clinging to her wreckage all night and swimming to shore the following day.
Norma	Italy	The cargo ship collided with the steamer Registan (United Kingdom) in the English Channel off Dungeness, Kent, United Kingdom. Norma was towed to Dover and beached.

=== 23 March ===
List of shipwrecks: 23 March 1931
Ship	State	Description
Evgenia Malona	Greece	The cargo ship ran aground at Sigri, Lesbos. She was refloated on 3 April.
Kanju Maru	Japan	The cargo ship ran aground at Erimosaki. She was declared a total loss on 8 April.
Mangana	Australia	The hulk was beached and abandoned at Port Adelaide, South Australia.
Ruta	Italy	The cargo ship was abandoned in the Atlantic Ocean off Madeira, Portugal (approximately 30°N 25°W). Her crew were rescued by Ville de Verdun (France).

=== 24 March ===
List of shipwrecks: 24 March 1931
Ship	State	Description
Aghios Ioannis	Greece	The three-masted schooner collided with Frinton (Greece) at Piraeus and sank.

=== 27 March ===
List of shipwrecks: 27 March 1931
Ship	State	Description
Lucerna	United Kingdom	The cargo ship ran aground on the Angelica Reef in the Flores Sea. She was refloated on 4 April.

=== 28 March ===
List of shipwrecks: 28 March 1931
Ship	State	Description
Arniston	United Kingdom	The cargo ship was crushed by ice in the Gulf of Riga (57°35′N 23°03′E) and sank. The crew survived.
Istar	United Kingdom	The retired fish factory ship was scuttled in the Indian Ocean 7 kilometres (3.8 nmi; 4.3 mi) off the harbor at Durban, South Africa.
Taxiarchis	Greece	The cargo ship ran aground on Lundy Island, Devon, United Kingdom. She was a total loss.

=== 29 March ===
List of shipwrecks: 29 March 1931
Ship	State	Description
Naiad	United Kingdom	The schooner ran aground on the Nailce Rocks, Looe, Cornwall and was wrecked. The crew were rescued.

=== 30 March ===
List of shipwrecks: 30 March 1931
Ship	State	Description
Tai Hing	United Kingdom	The cargo ship struck rocks at Hong Kong and was beached.

=== Unknown March ===
List of shipwrecks: Unknown March 1931
Ship	State	Description
"North Cape"	United Kingdom	The 138.5-foot (42.2 m) steam fishing trawler was last heard from on 16 March off Iceland. On 21 March trawler "Great Admiral" (United Kingdom) pick up a body that hadn't been in the water very long, thought to an engine room crewman from North Cape.

== April ==
=== 2 April ===
List of shipwrecks: 2 April 1931
Ship	State	Description
Florida	France	The ocean liner was rammed by HMS Glorious (Royal Navy) in the Mediterranean Sea off Málaga, Andalusia, Spain. One of Glorious's crew was killed, as were 24 passengers on board Florida. The passengers were transferred to Glorious, which towed Florida stern-first to Gibraltar, where she was beached.
Malabar	United Kingdom	Malabar The cargo liner ran aground off Long Bay, Sydney, New South Wales, Australia and was a total loss. All on board survived.
Tonjer	Norway	The cargo ship ran aground at Chingmae Point, China. She was refloated on 6 April.

=== 3 April ===
List of shipwrecks: 3 April 1931
Ship	State	Description
Ipswich Trader	United Kingdom	The cargo ship sprang a leak and was beached in Morlaix Bay, Finistère, France. She was refloated the next day.
Symor	United Kingdom	The cargo ship was rammed and sunk by USCGC Legare (United States Coast Guard) in the Atlantic Ocean 30 nautical miles (56 km) north of the Nantucket Lightship (United States Coast Guard) and sank. All ten crew were rescued by Legare.

=== 4 April ===
List of shipwrecks: 4 April 1931
Ship	State	Description
Harold Conrad	United Kingdom	The schooner sank in Garnish Fortune Bay, Newfoundland. The crew were rescued.
Sagona	United Kingdom	The coaster was driven ashore at Fogo, Newfoundland. She was refloated on 8 April.

=== 7 April ===
List of shipwrecks: 7 April 1931
Ship	State	Description
Cleone	United States	The cargo ship sprang a leak in the Pacific Ocean and was abandoned by her crew.
Hiyeizan Maru	Japan	The cargo ship ran aground at the western entrance of the Shimonoseki Strait. She was refloated on 20 April.

=== 9 April ===
List of shipwrecks: 9 April 1931
Ship	State	Description
Harry and Verna	United Kingdom	The schooner was abandoned in the Atlantic Ocean.
Nuna Alvirez D. Laviero	Portugal	The sailing ship caught fire and was abandoned in the Atlantic Ocean (40°49′N 9°31′W). The crew were rescued by Marrakech (France).

=== 10 April ===
List of shipwrecks: 10 April 1931
Ship	State	Description
HMAS Huon	Royal Australian Navy	The River-class torpedo-boat destroyer was scuttled after use as a gunnery target by the heavy cruisers HMAS Australia and HMAS Canberra, the destroyer leader HMAS Anzac, and the seaplane tender HMAS Albatross (all Royal Australian Navy).

=== 13 April ===
List of shipwrecks: 13 April 1931
Ship	State	Description
"Glenlyon"	United Kingdom	The salvage ship was driven onto a reef and sank in Palephterish Bay, Tiree, Inner Hebrides (56°31′N 06°52′W) while salvaging the cargo of the wrecked Malve (Finland) that was wrecked in February. The crew were rescued.
Wisla	Poland	The cargo ship sprang a leak off Gedser, Sjælland, Denmark and was beached.

=== 14 April ===
List of shipwrecks: 14 April 1931
Ship	State	Description
Dah Chong	China	The cargo ship collided with Tah Hwa (China) at Woosung and sank with the loss of six crew.

=== 15 April ===
List of shipwrecks: 15 April 1931
Ship	State	Description
Iskum	United States	The 82-gross register ton, 72.2-foot (22.0 m) motor vessel struck and slid off a submerged rock at 52°02′N 174°22′W – a position described by her captain as approximately 3 nautical miles (5.6 km; 3.5 mi) "east by north of Aasatanak, Pacific of south side of Aleutian Islands," apparently a reference to a submerged rock 3 nautical miles (5.6 km; 3.5 mi) northeast of Sadatanak Island (52°02′00″N 174°25′30″W) in the Aleutians – and was abandoned 70 minutes later due to flooding, eventually sinking a few hours after striking the rock. Her 18 passengers and crew abandoned ship in dories and spent the night on the beach, where the motor vessel Umnak Native (United States) arrived from Atka to rescue them the next day.

=== 17 April ===
List of shipwrecks: 17 April 1931
Ship	State	Description
Calder	United Kingdom	The cargo ship departed Hamburg, Germany, for Goole, Yorkshire. A lifeboat washed up at Chapel St. Leonards, Lincolnshire on 20 April. Presumed foundered in the North Sea with the loss of all hands.

=== 18 April ===
List of shipwrecks: 18 April 1931
Ship	State	Description
Cyclope	France	The dredger foundered in the North Sea 15 nautical miles (28 km) south east of Flamborough Head, Yorkshire.

=== 20 April ===
List of shipwrecks: 20 April 1931
Ship	State	Description
City of Washington	United States	The ship was destroyed by fire at Wilmington, Delaware.
West River	United States	The cargo ship was destroyed by fire at Wilmington.

=== 21 April ===
List of shipwrecks: 21 April 1931
Ship	State	Description
Hwah Yang	China	The passenger ship came ashore on Saddle Island, Heinan Group, South China Sea. All on board were rescued by Kung Ping (China) and Rajputana (United Kingdom).

=== 23 April ===
List of shipwrecks: 23 April 1931
Ship	State	Description
White Star	United States	The halibut schooner exploded and burned off the Tatoosh Islands in Southeast Alaska. Her entire crew of five escaped and rowed to safety at Neah Bay, Washington.

=== 25 April ===
List of shipwrecks: 25 April 1931
Ship	State	Description
Maria	Italy	The brigantine was rammed by Citta di Marsala (Italy) at Trapani, Sicily and sank.

=== 27 April ===
List of shipwrecks: 27 April 1931
Ship	State	Description
Ten-An Maru	Japan	The cargo ship ran aground on the south coast of Korea and sank. The crew were rescued.

=== 28 April ===
List of shipwrecks: 28 April 1931
Ship	State	Description
Castor	Sweden	The tanker caught fire in the Atlantic Ocean (39°47′N 21°44′W) and was abandoned. The crew were rescued by Excalibur (United States). She was taken in tow by Ousebridge (United Kingdom) and arrived at Ponta Delgada, Azores, Portugal on 2 May.
Hirosaki Maru	Japan	The cargo ship ran aground at Nemuro. She was refloated on 4 May.

=== 30 April ===
List of shipwrecks: 30 April 1931
Ship	State	Description
Nefeli	Greece	The cargo ship ran aground at Cape Akin. She was refloated on 4 May.
Raymond R	United Kingdom	The schooner departed Miquelon for Porto, Portugal. No further trace, presumed foundered with the loss of all hands.

== May ==
=== 1 May ===
List of shipwrecks: 1 May 1931
Ship	State	Description
Vouga	Portuguese Navy	Madeira uprising: The Guadiana-class destroyer sank due to damage suffered in a collision off Madeira Island with the ocean liner Pedro Gomes (Portugal) halfway between Madeira and Porto Santo Island in the Madeira Islands while Pedro Gomes was attempting to tow her. Pedro Gomes rescued her crew.

=== 4 May ===
List of shipwrecks: 4 May 1931
Ship	State	Description
Ibasa	Spain	The barque came ashore at Zumaya, Spain and was wrecked.
Koit	Latvia	The cargo ship caught fire in the Baltic Sea and was abandoned. Her crew were rescued.

=== 6 May ===
List of shipwrecks: 6 May 1931
Ship	State	Description
Raffio	Italy	The salvage vessel capsized and sank off Sark, Channel Islands with the loss of one of her eighteen crew.

=== 7 May ===
List of shipwrecks: 7 May 1931
Ship	State	Description
Trimount	United States	The tug collided with New York (United States) in Long Island Sound and sank. Four crew were rescued by New York.

=== 8 May ===
List of shipwrecks: 8 May 1931
Ship	State	Description
Ruth Kellogg	United States	The tanker caught fire 250 nautical miles (460 km) south of Cape Hatteras, North Carolina. The steamer John D. Archbold stood by to assist. The fire was extinguished the next day, and Ruth Kellogg proceeded to New York, arriving on 11 May 1931. She was repaired and returned to service.

=== 10 May ===
List of shipwrecks: 10 May 1931
Ship	State	Description
Daily Mail	United Kingdom	The 141.7-foot (43.2 m), 386-ton steam trawler ran aground on rocks in fog at Cammag Head, the Rhins of Galloway. Pulled off on 11 May but grounded again in Portencorkie Bay. The crew were rescued by the trawler Tranquil (United Kingdom). In August her boiler was salvaged and placed on a barge, either the barge or the boiler foundered, the ship was declared a total loss.
Milewater	United Kingdom	The 135.2-foot (41.2 m), 290-ton salvage tug ran aground on the Mull of Oa, Islay and was wrecked. All seven crew were rescued.

=== 12 May ===
List of shipwrecks: 12 May 1931
Ship	State	Description
Lucille B. Creaser	United Kingdom	The schooner foundered off Cape St. Mary's, Newfoundland. The crew were rescued by Alice B. Hayden (United Kingdom).

=== 13 May ===
List of shipwrecks: 13 May 1931
Ship	State	Description
Audrey	United States	A fire broke out in the engine room of the 22-gross register ton motor vessel while she was in Sukkwan Strait in the Alexander Archipelago in Southeast Alaska during a voyage from Craig to Hydaburg, Territory of Alaska. After it went out of control, her crew of three abandoned ship in a rowboat and survived. Audrey drifted ashore on the north end of Sukkwan Island, where the fire destroyed her.
J. O. Webster	United States	The schooner came ashore in Long Island Sound and was wrecked.

=== 14 May ===
List of shipwrecks: 14 May 1931
Ship	State	Description
HNLMS Sumatra	Royal Netherlands Navy	The Java-class cruiser ran aground off Koemba Island, Netherlands East Indies. She was refloated three days later. Subsequently repaired and returned to service.

=== 15 May ===
List of shipwrecks: 15 May 1931
Ship	State	Description
USS PE-42	United States Navy	The decommissioned Eagle-class patrol craft was scuttled in 240 feet (73 m) of water east of Boston, Massachusetts, 10 nautical miles (19 km; 12 mi) east of Graves Light.

=== 17 May ===
List of shipwrecks: 17 May 1931
Ship	State	Description
Pravia	Spain	The cargo ship foundered off the Spanish coast.

=== 22 May ===
List of shipwrecks: 22 May 1931
Ship	State	Description
Rabochiy	Soviet Navy	The Bars-class submarine collided with Krasnoarmeyets (Soviet Navy) in the Gulf of Finland 5 nautical miles (9.3 km) south west of the Aerandsgrund Lightship (Finland) and sank with the loss of all 39 crew. The submarine was raised in 1933 and scrapped.

=== 26 May ===
List of shipwrecks: 26 May 1931
Ship	State	Description
El Golea	France	The cargo ship ran aground at Cape Freu, Mallorca, Spain. She was still agrount on 15 June, but was subsequently declared a total loss.

=== 27 May ===
List of shipwrecks: 27 May 1931
Ship	State	Description
Corretora Primeiro	Portugal	The coaster caught fire in the Bay of Biscay (45°04′N 7°55′W). The crew were rescued by Dunkwa (United Kingdom). She was taken in tow by Seine (France) but foundered the next day (44°58′N 7°56′W).

=== 28 May ===
List of shipwrecks: 28 May 1931
Ship	State	Description
Imperial	United States	While no one was aboard, the 22-gross register ton motor vessel was destroyed by fire while at anchor in the Copper River Flats on the south-central coast of the Territory of Alaska.

=== 30 May ===
List of shipwrecks: 30 May 1931
Ship	State	Description
Harvard	United States	Harvard. The passenger ship was wrecked 4 nautical miles (7.4 km) north of Point Arguello, California. All on board were rescued by Louisville (United States) and USCGC Tamaroa ( United States Coast Guard).
Shirakami Maru	Japan	The cargo ship collided with Sanjin Maru (Japan) off Muroran and sank.

== June ==
=== 5 June ===
List of shipwrecks: 5 June 1931
Ship	State	Description
Amphitrite	France	The auxiliary sailing vessel sank off the French coast. All crew were rescued.
Vera	Denmark	The schooner ran was driven ashore at Bolderāja, Latvia. She was refloated on 9 June.
Via	United Kingdom	The auxiliary schooner ran aground on the Helly Hunter Reef off Carlingford Lough, Ireland and was wrecked. The crew were rescued.

=== 7 June ===
List of shipwrecks: 7 June 1931
Ship	State	Description
Anatolia	Germany	The cargo ship ran aground in the River Amazon, Brazil. She was refloated on 12 June.

=== 9 June ===
List of shipwrecks: 9 June 1931
Ship	State	Description
HMS Poseidon	Royal Navy	The Parthian-class submarine collided with Yuta (China) off Weihai, China and sank with the loss of 22 of her 59 crew.
Replenish	United Kingdom	The drifter was sunk in a collision with the trawler Chamberlain (United Kingdom) 50 miles (80 km) off Aberdeen.

=== 11 June ===
List of shipwrecks: 11 June 1931
Ship	State	Description
HMAS Yarra	Royal Australian Navy	The hulk of the decommissioned River-class torpedo-boat destroyer was probably scuttled on this date off Sydney Heads.
Yeijin Maru	Japan	The cargo ship passed the Hinomisaki Lighthouse, Izumo, Shimane bound for Tokyo. No further trace, presumed foundered in a typhoon with the loss of all hands.

=== 12 June ===
List of shipwrecks: 12 June 1931
Ship	State	Description
Shuben Acadia	United Kingdom	The cargo ship collided with a United States Coast Guard destroyer in the Atlantic Ocean 50 nautical miles (93 km) south of Montauk Point, New York, United States and sank.
U.S. La Vallee	United States	The retired 56-foot (17 m) tug was scuttled in deep water in Shelburne Bay on Lake Champlain, just south of Burlington, Vermont.

=== 13 June ===
List of shipwrecks: 13 June 1931
Ship	State	Description
Urania	Greece	The cargo ship collided with Beaufort (Norway) in the North Sea (51°44′N 2°43′E) and sank. The crew were rescued by Beaufort.

=== 14 June ===
List of shipwrecks: 14 June 1931
Ship	State	Description
Delaware	United States	Carrying a cargo of 4.5 tons of barreled salt, ballast, and tools, the 32-gross register ton motor vessel sank after striking a submerged object 18 nautical miles (33 km; 21 mi) north of the Barren Islands near the entrance to Cook Inlet on the south-central coast of the Territory of Alaska. Her crew of four survived.
St. Philibert	France	St. Philibert The passenger ship foundered in the Bay of Biscay off Pointe Saint-Gildas, Loire-Inférieure. There were eight survivors of the 500 people on board.
Ungheria	Italy	The cargo ship collided with Rochambeau (France) in the Bay of Biscay off Ouessant, Finistère, France and sank. All crew were rescued by Rochambeau.
Werner Vinnen	Germany	The auxiliary five-masted schooner ran aground in the Paraná River, Argentina. She was refloated on 15 August.

=== 17 June ===
List of shipwrecks: 17 June 1931
Ship	State	Description
MV Bermuda	United Kingdom	MV Bermuda The ocean liner caught fire at Hamilton, Bermuda with the loss of two lives. She was extensively damaged, with her superstructure destroyed. She departed Bermuda on 6 July for repair at Belfast. A further fire occurred on 19 November whilst she was under repair. Bermuda was declared a total loss.

=== 18 June ===
List of shipwrecks: 18 June 1931
Ship	State	Description
Anglia	Sweden	The cargo ship collided with Agire Mendi (Spain) at San Nicolás, Buenos Aires, Argentina and sank. Her crew were rescued.
Elisabeth	Germany	The coaster was rammed and sunk by Penelope (Danzig) at Nordenham, Germany.

=== 19 June ===
List of shipwrecks: 19 June 1931
Ship	State	Description
Anastassios Pateras	Greece	The cargo ship ran aground in the Paraná River, Argentina. She was refloated on 23 June.

=== 20 June ===
List of shipwrecks: 20 June 1931
Ship	State	Description
Dixmude	United Kingdom	The schooner sprang a leak and sank in Placentia Bay.
Hilda	United States	The 10-gross register ton fishing vessel was wrecked on rocks at Cape Ulitka (55°33′45″N 133°43′35″W) in Southeast Alaska after her anchor line parted. The only person aboard survived.

=== 22 June ===
List of shipwrecks: 22 June 1931
Ship	State	Description
Empress	United Kingdom	The passenger ship was destroyed by fire at Saint John, New Brunswick, Canada.

=== 23 June ===
List of shipwrecks: 23 June 1931
Ship	State	Description
Cumberland	United States Army	The United States Army Corps of Engineers dredge struck a pile of cement and sank off Fort Lauderdale, Florida.

=== 27 June ===
List of shipwrecks: 27 June 1931
Ship	State	Description
King Bleddyn	United Kingdom	The cargo ship ran aground at Punta Indigo, Argentina. She was refloated on 21 July.

=== 28 June ===
List of shipwrecks: 28 June 1931
Ship	State	Description
Nervi	Italy	The cargo ship ran aground at Ténès, Algeria. She was refloated two days later but foundered in the Mediterranean Sea 20 nautical miles (37 km) north of Cape Ivi (36°44′N 0°12′E). All crew were rescued.

=== 29 June ===
List of shipwrecks: 29 June 1931
Ship	State	Description
Kohso Maru	Japan	The cargo ship caught fire at Candon, Philippines and was beached. She was refloated on 3 July.

== July ==
=== 1 July ===
List of shipwrecks: 1 July 1931
Ship	State	Description
Currier	United States	The tanker was severely damaged by fire at Port Arthur, Texas.
Gulf of Mexico	United States	The tanker was severely damaged by fire at Port Arthur.
Shenango	United States	The tanker was severely damaged by fire at Port Arthur.

=== 3 July ===
List of shipwrecks: 3 July 1931
Ship	State	Description
Aleco	Greece	The cargo ship ran aground at Injeh Burnu, Turkey. She was refloated on 6 July.

=== 4 July ===
List of shipwrecks: 4 July 1931
Ship	State	Description
Borg	Norway	The cargo ship grounded on the North Shoal. She refloated but was found to be holed and was beached in Birsay Bay, Orkney Islands, United Kingdom. She was abandoned as a total loss.

=== 7 July ===
List of shipwrecks: 7 July 1931
Ship	State	Description
Yaye Maru No.2	Japan	The tanker foundered in the Yellow Sea 200 nautical miles (370 km) west of Arusomu, Korea.

=== 8 July ===
List of shipwrecks: 8 July 1931
Ship	State	Description
Erik Larsen	Germany	The cargo ship ran aground at Slettnes, Norway. She was consequently beached at Honningsvåg. She was refloated the next day.

=== 10 July ===
List of shipwrecks: 10 July 1931
Ship	State	Description
Annie B. Gerhardt	United Kingdom	The schooner was destroyed by fire in the Atlantic Ocean 10 nautical miles (19 km) off Miquelon. All crew survived.
Erkki	Finland	The sailing ship came ashore east of Ystad, Sweden and was wrecked. The crew survived.
Zampa	Denmark	The schooner came ashore at Ystad and was severely damaged. The crew were rescued. She was refloated on 18 July

=== 11 July ===
List of shipwrecks: 11 July 1931
Ship	State	Description
Basque	United Kingdom	The cargo ship struck rocks at Isle aux Morts, Newfoundland and was beached. She was declared a total loss.
Gote	Sweden	The auxiliary schooner sank in the Baltic Sea off North Cape, Öland with the loss of one crew member. Survivors were rescued by Irmgard (Germany).

=== 12 July ===
List of shipwrecks: 12 July 1931
Ship	State	Description
Oregonian	United States	The 45.02-gross register ton fishing vessel sank in bad weather in Kvichak Bay on the Bristol Bay coast of the Territory of Alaska approximately 10 nautical miles (19 km; 12 mi) west of Middle Bluff Light (58°24′20″N 157°31′15″W). Her entire crew of four survived.

=== 15 July ===
List of shipwrecks: 15 July 1931
Ship	State	Description
Fairland	United States	The 14-gross register ton fishing vessel was beached in Idaho Inlet (58°10′N 136°12′W) in Southeast Alaska after she caught fire. The fire continued to burn out of control and destroyed her on the beach. Her crew of six survived.
Porto Alegre	Portugal	The coaster sank off Calabar, Nigeria. The crew survived.

=== 17 July ===
List of shipwrecks: 17 July 1931
Ship	State	Description
No. 00	United States	While under tow by the vessel Kvichak (United States) from Nushagak to Ugashik, Territory of Alaska, with a cargo of 80 tons of cans, can ends, boxes, and can tops, the unmanned 98-ton barge capsized and sank during a gale at Cape Grieg (57°43′30″N 157°41′30″W) on the Bristol Bay coast of the Alaska Peninsula.

=== 18 July ===
List of shipwrecks: 18 July 1931
Ship	State	Description
Promptitude	United Kingdom	The Thames barge collided with Kew Railway Bridge and sank in the River Thames. Both crew survived.
Towanjiro Maru	Japan	The cargo ship was destroyed by fire at Shimoda.

=== 19 July ===
List of shipwrecks: 19 July 1931
Ship	State	Description
Chitose	Imperial Japanese Navy	The Kasagi-class cruiser was sunk as target in a live fire exercise off Kōchi.
Keishin Maru	Japan	The cargo ship ran aground at Nagasaki and was abandoned by her crew.

=== 20 July ===
List of shipwrecks: 20 July 1931
Ship	State	Description
Chohaku Maru	Japan	The cargo ship ran aground at Ushima and was beached. She was refloated the next day.
Northern	United States	The halibut schooner was destroyed by fire in Sumner Strait in the Alexander Archipelago in Southeast Alaska. The schooner Akutan (United States) rescued her crew.

=== 21 July ===
List of shipwrecks: 21 July 1931
Ship	State	Description
Alice	United States	The 27-gross register ton motor vessel burned, suffered an engine room explosion, and sank 8 nautical miles (15 km; 9.2 mi) south of Point Baker, Territory of Alaska. Her crew of two survived.

=== 22 July ===
List of shipwrecks: 22 July 1931
Ship	State	Description
Dainichi Maru	Japan	The cargo ship ran aground at Ornai Zaki in the Suruga Gulf. She was declared a total loss on 29 July.

=== 23 July ===
List of shipwrecks: 23 July 1931
Ship	State	Description
HMAS Warrego	Royal Australian Navy	The decommissioned destroyer, in use as an accommodation hulk, sank at her berth at Cockatoo Island in Sydney Harbour, Sydney, New South Wales, Australia. She was broken up in situ.

=== 27 July ===
List of shipwrecks: 27 July 1931
Ship	State	Description
Pennsylvania	Denmark	The cargo ship ran aground on Swona, Orkney Islands, United Kingdom. She was declared a total loss on 30 July.

=== 30 July ===
List of shipwrecks: 30 July 1931
Ship	State	Description
Cowlitz	United States	The shallow-draft sternwheeler was swamped by large waves, capsized, and sank in the Columbia River 5 miles (8 km) west of The Dalles, Oregon. All aboard survived.

== August ==
=== 2 August ===
List of shipwrecks: 2 August 1931
Ship	State	Description
Lark	United Kingdom	The Thames barge sank at Pelican Wharf, Wapping, London.

=== 3 August ===
List of shipwrecks: 3 August 1931
Ship	State	Description
Dolphin	United Kingdom	The tug was sunk at Montreal, Quebec, Canada when Rapids Prince (United Kingdom) struck lock gates in the Lachine Canal and carried them away.

=== 6 August ===
List of shipwrecks: 6 August 1931
Ship	State	Description
Kotare	United Kingdom	The coaster was destroyed by fire at Invercargill, New Zealand.

=== 7 August ===
List of shipwrecks: 7 August 1931
Ship	State	Description
J. N. Challoner	United Kingdom	The schooner foundered in Bonne Bay, Newfoundland.

=== 8 August ===
List of shipwrecks: 8 August 1931
Ship	State	Description
Kwong Sang	United Kingdom	The cargo ship was last reported off Taichow Island, China. She subsequently foundered in a typhoon off Fuyan Island. with the loss of 53 of her 56 crew. Survivors were rescued by Sepoy (Royal Navy) after they had been captured by pirates.
Western World	United States	The Design 1029 passenger ship ran aground at Porto do Boi, Brazil. The 85 passengers were taken off by General Osorio (Germany) and landed at Rio de Janeiro. She was refloated on 10 September.

=== 11 August ===
List of shipwrecks: 11 August 1931
Ship	State	Description
Ryburn	United Kingdom	The cargo ship foundered in the Norwegian Sea (62°39′N 4°50′E) with the loss of one of her 26 crew. Survivors were rescued by Jotunfjeld (Norway).
Wai-Shing	China	The cargo ship ran aground off Soaliyan. She was refloated on 20 August.

=== 12 August ===
List of shipwrecks: 12 August 1931
Ship	State	Description
Amity	Sweden	The cargo ship ran aground at Gravelines, Nord, France and broke in two.
Democrat	United States	The 34-gross register ton fishing vessel sank in Cook Inlet on the south-central coast of the Territory of Alaska northwest of Yukon Island due to flooding from undetected damage she incurred when she struck a reef the previous day. Her crew of six survived.
Marmot	United States	The 44-gross register ton halibut-fishing ketch was destroyed off Two Headed Island (56°54′N 153°35′W) in the Kodiak Archipelago near Kodiak Island by a fire that broke out in her engine room. Her entire crew of seven abandoned ship in two dories; one of them died in one of the dories on the morning of 13 August.
Omiros	Greece	The cargo ship struck rocks at Skantzoura and sank.

=== 13 August ===
List of shipwrecks: 13 August 1931
Ship	State	Description
Vorma	Norway	The cargo ship came ashore in Penobscot Bay, Maine, United States. She was refloated on 17 August.

=== 14 August ===
List of shipwrecks: 14 August 1931
Ship	State	Description
Kronstad	Norway	The cargo ship sprang a leak in the Norwegian Sea and was beached at Sandtorg, Norway.

=== 15 August ===
List of shipwrecks: 15 August 1931
Ship	State	Description
Huasco	Chile	The cargo ship ran aground on the Tres Hermanas Bank, off Corral. She was refloatedd on 11 September.

=== 17 August ===
List of shipwrecks: 17 August 1931
Ship	State	Description
Jinju Maru	Japan	The cargo ship ran aground on the Kamchatka Peninsula, Soviet Union. She was refloated on 28 August.

=== 18 August ===
List of shipwrecks: 18 August 1931
Ship	State	Description
Eagle	United Kingdom	The Thames barge sank at the Royal Arsenal Coaling Pier, Woolwich, London. She was raised later that day and towed to Rotherhithe.
Electric Flash	United Kingdom	The schooner struck rocks off White Island, Labrador, Canada. She sailed to Griquet but was declared a total loss.

=== 21 August ===
List of shipwrecks: 21 August 1931
Ship	State	Description
Marija Petrinovic	Yugoslavia	The cargo ship ran aground in the Paraná River, Argentina. She was refloated on 22 September.

=== 23 August ===
List of shipwrecks: 23 August 1931
Ship	State	Description
Flying Dutchman	Netherlands	The coaster foundered in the North Sea (52°54′30″N 4°01′30″E). All seven on board were rescued by Heron (United Kingdom).

=== 25 August ===
List of shipwrecks: 25 August 1931
Ship	State	Description
Antonio Diaz	Chile	The cargo ship sank at Puerto Caballo, Venezuela.
Saint Mungo	United Kingdom	The coaster collided with the coaster Mayflower in the River Mersey at Liverpool, Lancashire. Saint Mungo sank with the loss of two of her eighteen crew. Mayflower was beached at New Brighton, Cheshire. Mayflower was refloated on 27 August. Saint Mungo was refloated on 4 September and beached at Tranmere, Cheshire.

=== 26 August ===
List of shipwrecks: 26 August 1931
Ship	State	Description
King Edgar	United Kingdom	The cargo ship ran aground in the Black Sea off Berezan Island, Soviet Union. She was refloated on 3 September.

=== 27 August ===
List of shipwrecks: 27 August 1931
Ship	State	Description
Liverpool Maru	Japan	The cargo ship ran aground on Kunshiri Island. She was refloated on 2 September.

=== 28 August ===
List of shipwrecks: 28 August 1931
Ship	State	Description
Mary C. Fisher	United States	During a voyage from Kodiak on Kodiak Island to Dutch Harbor and Unalaska in the Aleutian Islands, the 12-gross register ton, two-masted vessel sank in a storm in the Shelikof Strait 3 nautical miles (5.6 km; 3.5 mi) east of Cape Kubugukli (57°53′50″N 155°03′35″W) on the coast of the Alaska Peninsula. Her three-man crew abandoned ship and reached safety after a seven-day voyage in a skiff.

=== 31 August ===
List of shipwrecks: 31 August 1931
Ship	State	Description
Lady Allen	United Kingdom	The Thames barge, loaded with oats, collided with the liner Llanstephan Castle (United Kingdom) off Southend Pier, Essex, and sank in the Thames Estuary. Both crew were rescued by Llanstephan Castle.

== September ==
=== 1 September ===
List of shipwrecks: 1 September 1931
Ship	State	Description
HMS Emperor of India	Royal Navy	The decommissioned Iron Duke-class battleship was sunk as a gunnery target. Her wreck was refloated and on 6 February 1932 was sold for breaking up.
Evgenia Chandri	Greece	The cargo ship ran aground on La Nata Island. She sank on 6 September.
Uad Targa	Spanish Navy	The Uad Ras-class naval trawler was wrecked on this date.

=== 2 September ===
List of shipwrecks: 2 September 1931
Ship	State	Description
Balva	Latvia	The cargo ship struck a rock and sank at Pärnu, Estonia. The crew survived.

=== 3 September ===
List of shipwrecks: 3 September 1931
Ship	State	Description
Kaiapoi	United Kingdom	The cargo ship ran aground on a reef at 4°29′N 119°22′E. She was refloated on 1 October.
Saint Anthony	United Kingdom	The 80.4-foot (24.5 m), 115-ton steam barge ran aground in Balephetrish Bay, Ireland and sank.

=== 4 September ===
List of shipwrecks: 4 September 1931
Ship	State	Description
Burgenland	Germany	The cargo liner ran aground in the Yellow Sea at Chinto, Korea (36°04′N 126°10′E). All 85 people on board abandoned ship. She was refloated on 18 September.

=== 5 September ===
List of shipwrecks: 5 September 1931
Ship	State	Description
Gioconda	Italy	The cargo ship collided with Stampalia (Italy) at Ancona, Marche and sank. She was refloated on 5 November.
Opal	United Kingdom	The coaster foundered in the Atlantic Ocean off Land's End, Cornwall with the loss of two of her eleven crew. Survivors were rescued by Wild Rose (United Kingdom).
Zachariosa	Greece	The cargo ship grounded on the Mansell Shoal, Turkey and was holed. She was consequently beached. Zachariosa was refloated on 14 September.

=== 7 September ===
List of shipwrecks: 7 September 1931
Ship	State	Description
North Devon	United Kingdom	The cargo ship ran aground in Tutoya Bay, Brazil. She was refloated on 11 September.

=== 8 September ===
List of shipwrecks: 8 September 1931
Ship	State	Description
Chiang Hung	Republic of China Navy	The gunboat was wrecked.

=== 9 September ===
List of shipwrecks: 9 September 1931
Ship	State	Description
Koraaga	United Kingdom	: The trawler ran aground off Bass Point, New South Wales. She sank the next day.

=== 10 September ===
List of shipwrecks: 10 September 1931
Ship	State	Description
Tagalak	United States	The 71-gross register ton, 65.3-foot (19.9 m) fishing vessel was destroyed in Sukkwan Strait 2 nautical miles (3.7 km; 2.3 mi) southeast of Hydaburg in Southeast Alaska by a fire that began in the engine room, presumably due to crossed electrical wires, and engulfed the vessel only three minutes after her six-member crew first noticed smoke. All on board survived.

=== 12 September ===
List of shipwrecks: 12 September 1931
Ship	State	Description
Cecilia M. Dunlap	United States	While under tow from Pennsylvania to New Jersey with a cargo of 10,000 barrels of oil, the 199-foot (60.7 m), 793-gross register ton schooner barge — a converted bark — sank in heavy seas in 60 feet (18 m) of water in the North Atlantic Ocean off Sandy Hook, New Jersey, at 40°25.374′N 073°52.828′W.

=== 13 September ===
List of shipwrecks: 13 September 1931
Ship	State	Description
Colombia	United States	The ocean liner ran aground at Point Tosco. Lower California, Mexico. All 234 people on board were rescued by La Perla and San Mateo (both United States).

=== 15 September ===
List of shipwrecks: 15 September 1931
Ship	State	Description
Carmen	United States	During a voyage from Petersburg to Juneau, Territory of Alaska, with a cargo of 10 tons of shingles, the 35-gross register ton motor vessel was destroyed in Gastineau Channel in the Alexander Archipelago in Southeast Alaska by a fire that began when her gasoline engine backfired. Her crew of three survived unharmed.
Siangwo	United Kingdom	The cargo ship ran aground between Hangkow and Shasi, China. She was refloated on 19 September.

=== 16 September ===
List of shipwrecks: 16 September 1931
Ship	State	Description
Herbert Green	United Kingdom	The cargo ship foundered in the Atlantic Ocean whilst on a voyage from Burgeo, Newfoundland to Halifax, Nova Scotia, Canada. The crew survived.
Norna	Danzig	The cargo ship ran aground near the Grinna Lighthouse, Norway. She was declared a total loss.

=== 18 September ===
List of shipwrecks: 18 September 1931
Ship	State	Description
Roma	United Kingdom	The coaster ran aground at Barrow-in-Furness, Lancashire. She was refloated on 24 September.

=== 19 September ===
List of shipwrecks: 19 September 1931
Ship	State	Description
Lyminge	United Kingdom	The cargo ship ran aground on Ebal Rocks off Gurnard's Head and was a total loss. All nineteen crew and three passengers rowed ashore. The ship's cat was rescued later.

=== 22 September ===
List of shipwrecks: 22 September 1931
Ship	State	Description
Gladiator	United States	During a voyage from Nome, Territory of Alaska, to Seattle, Washington, with a crew of three and a 7-ton cargo of oil, Alaska curios, and other items, the 21-gross register ton motor vessel drifted ashore and was wrecked on the coast of Unimak Island in the Aleutian Islands, 20 nautical miles (37 km; 23 mi) northeast of Cape Sarichef (58°24′20″N 157°31′15″W) after her steering gear broke during a gale. The cutter USCGC Chelan ( United States Coast Guard) rescued her crew.

=== 23 September ===
List of shipwrecks: 23 September 1931
Ship	State	Description
Tokalou	United Kingdom	The schooner came ashore on Noggin Cove Island, Newfoundland and was a total loss.

=== 24 September ===
List of shipwrecks: 24 September 1931
Ship	State	Description
Atlanticos	Greece	The cargo ship ran aground at Diamante, Calabria, Italy. She was refloated on 29 September.

=== 25 September ===
List of shipwrecks: 25 September 1931
Ship	State	Description
Fritz	Germany	The dredger foundered in the Bay of Biscay whilst under tow.

=== 27 September ===
List of shipwrecks: 27 September 1931
Ship	State	Description
Laine	Estonia	The cargo ship sank in the Baltic Sea off Lyserort, Latvia. The crew were rescued.

=== 28 September ===
List of shipwrecks: 28 September 1931
Ship	State	Description
Rosandra	Italy	The cargo ship ran aground at Walvis Bay, at that time a South African enclave in South-West Africa. She was refloated on 11 October.

=== 29 September ===
List of shipwrecks: 29 September 1931
Ship	State	Description
Baychimo	United Kingdom	The cargo ship became mired in ice near Barrow, Alaska, United States.
Elloughton	United Kingdom	The cargo ship sank in the Blavet at Hennebont, Morbihan, France. She was refloated on 13 October.

=== Unknown date ===
List of shipwrecks: Unknown date in September 1931
Ship	State	Description
Ostrea	Canada	The towboat struck a submerged object at Port Morien, Nova Scotia and consequently sank 3 1/2 nautical miles (6.5 km) offshore. Her crew took to the lifeboats and survived.

== October ==
=== 1 October ===
List of shipwrecks: 1 October 1931
Ship	State	Description
Hesleyside	United Kingdom	The coaster ran aground in the River Foyle at Derry, County Londonderry. She was refloated on 6 October.

=== 2 October ===
List of shipwrecks: 2 October 1931
Ship	State	Description
Abington	United Kingdom	The coaster ran aground at Ramsey, Isle of Man. She was refloated on 9 October.
Margaret Lake	United Kingdom	The schooner came ashore on Peckford Island, Newfoundland and was a total loss.

=== 3 October ===
List of shipwrecks: 3 October 1931
Ship	State	Description
Johanna	Netherlands	The cargo ship ran aground off the Ar Men Lighthouse, Île de Sein, Finistère, France. All passengers and crew were taken off. She was a total loss.

=== 5 October ===
List of shipwrecks: 5 October 1931
Ship	State	Description
Agios Nicolaos	Greece	The coaster ran aground at Cape Drepano and sank with the loss of a crew member.

=== 6 October ===
List of shipwrecks: 6 October 1931
Ship	State	Description
Henri Mory	France	The cargo ship ran aground at Cabo Carvoeiro, Portugal. She was abandoned as a total loss.

=== 11 October ===
List of shipwrecks: 11 October 1931
Ship	State	Description
Maria Celina	Spain	The cargo ship ran aground at Cabo de Perros. The crew were rescued.

=== 12 October ===
List of shipwrecks: 12 October 1931
Ship	State	Description
Charles H. Bradley	United States	The cargo ship caught fire in the Great Lakes and was destroyed.
Cynthia G. Parker	United Kingdom	The schooner came ashore at English Point, Newfoundland and was a total loss.
Themsis	France	The 31 GRT crabber was sunk in a collision while anchored in dense fog with the trawler William Humphries (United Kingdom) off Milford. All six crew survived.

=== 13 October ===
List of shipwrecks: 13 October 1931
Ship	State	Description
Hyugo Maru	Japan	The cargo ship ran aground at Nomo, Nagasaki. The crew were rescued.
Tosei Maru	Japan	The cargo ship foundered off the Okinawa Islands. The crew were rescued.

=== 15 October ===
List of shipwrecks: 15 October 1931
Ship	State	Description
Canusa	United Kingdom	The cargo ship foundered in the Atlantic Ocean 150 nautical miles (280 km) east of Watlings Island, Bahamas. The crew were rescued.

=== 16 October ===
List of shipwrecks: 16 October 1931
Ship	State	Description
Kaitsu Maru	Japan	The cargo ship ran aground off the east coast of Sakhalin, Soviet Union. She was refloated on 27 October.
Selfoss	Iceland	The coaster ran aground at Stykkisholm. She was refloated on 23 October.
Yonan Maru	Japan	The cargo ship foundered in the Pacific Ocean off Sitka Island, Aleutian Islands, Alaska, United States.

=== 17 October ===
List of shipwrecks: 17 October 1931
Ship	State	Description
Ketchum	United States	During a voyage from Ketchikan to Dolomi, Territory of Alaska, with a cargo of one ton of household furniture, the 8-gross register ton motor vessel's anchor lines broke during a storm in Clarence Strait in the Alexander Archipelago in Southeast Alaska 1.5 nautical miles (2.8 km; 1.7 mi) north of Wedge Island (55°09′N 131°58′W), causing her to become stranded on a rock and then run aground on the beach, where she was pounded to pieces by the surf.

=== 19 October ===
List of shipwrecks: 19 October 1931
Ship	State	Description
Aghios Spyridon	Greece	The cargo ship sprang a leak and was beached at Ustica, Palermo, Italy. She was refloated on 24 or 25 October.
Emile Louis (schooner)	United Kingdom	The schooner came ashore at South Point, Anticosti Island, Quebec, Canada and was abandoned by her crew.

=== 21 October ===
List of shipwrecks: 21 October 1931
Ship	State	Description
Magallanes	Chile	The cargo ship ran aground on Cahuache Island and was beached at Point Chonos. She was refloated on 26 October.
Peder Most	Denmark	The cargo ship ran aground on Scharhörn, Hamburg, Germany. She was refloated on 24 October.

=== 22 October ===
List of shipwrecks: 22 October 1931
Ship	State	Description
Emil	Germany	The auxiliary three-masted schooner came ashore at the Bjørn Island Lighthouse, Sweden and was wrecked.
Oakford	United Kingdom	The cargo ship collided with Portia (Germany) in the River Thames at Woolwich, London with the loss of one of her crew. She was beached. She was refloated on 24 October.

=== 23 October ===
List of shipwrecks: 23 October 1931
Ship	State	Description
USCGC CG-243	United States Coast Guard	The cutter was destroyed, circumstances unknown.
Shinyetsu Maru	Japan	The cargo ship ran aground at Yetorup, Kurile Islands and sank.

=== 27 October ===
List of shipwrecks: 27 October 1931
Ship	State	Description
City of Stamford	United States	The cargo ship sank in the East River off Blackwell's Island, New York.
Heddy	Sweden	The cargo vessel was stranded in Vänersee. The wreck was salvaged and scrapped..
Marelton	United Kingdom	The schooner caught fire at Saint-Pierre, Saint Pierre and Miquelon and was a total loss.
Ullstad	Norway	The cargo ship ran aground at Yeniköy, Istanbul, Turkey. She was refloated on 7 November.
Yoro Maru	Japan	The cargo ship ran aground in the Bonin Islands and was a total loss.

=== 28 October ===
List of shipwrecks: 28 October 1931
Ship	State	Description
Bronte	United Kingdom	The cargo ship ran aground at Rosario, Brazil. She was refloated on 31 October.
Heddy	Sweden	The cargo ship ran aground in Lake Vener. She was refloated on 2 November.

=== 31 October ===
List of shipwrecks: 31 October 1931
Ship	State	Description
Saka	Latvia	The cargo ship sprang a leak and sank in the Baltic Sea off Trelleborg, Skåne County, Sweden. The crew were rescued.

== November ==
=== 1 November ===
List of shipwrecks: 1 November 1931
Ship	State	Description
Persephone	Greece	The tug foundered in the Aegean Sea off Kythnos with the loss of all four crew.

=== 3 November ===
List of shipwrecks: 3 November 1931
Ship	State	Description
Ansio	Finland	The barquentine ran aground at Holmsund, Västerbotten County, Sweden and was wrecked.
Criscilla	United Kingdom	The 135.5-foot (41.3 m), 350-ton steam trawler was stranded in a storm on a reef off Black Rocks 2 miles (3.2 km) northeast of McArthurs Head, at the entrance to Islay Sound, Islay. She was abandoned on 6 November, crew taken off by "Fyldea" (United Kingdom). She was refloated with compressed air on 7 December, but the patch was torn off after moving 60 feet (18 m) and she capsized and sank (55°47′N 06°04′W).
Maurice Colignon	Belgium	The cargo ship was driven ashore at Alexandretta, Turkey. She was refloated on 6 November.
Sainte Annen	France	The schooner lost her rudder and sails in heavy seas and went ashore at Porthleven, Cornwall, United Kingdom whilst trying to put into the harbour for repairs.

=== 4 November ===
List of shipwrecks: 4 November 1931
Ship	State	Description
Havet	Denmark	The auxiliary schooner collided with Konsul Schulte (Germany) in the Baltic Sea off Swinemünde, Western Pomerania, Germany. She capsized and sank.
Vettern II	Sweden	The cargo ship collided with Elfkungen (Sweden) at Gothenburg and sank. She was raised on 14 November.

=== 6 November ===
List of shipwrecks: 6 November 1931
Ship	State	Description
Hybert	United States	The cargo ship ran aground on the Goodwin Sands, Kent, United Kingdom. She was refloated on 9 November.

=== 7 November ===
List of shipwrecks: 7 November 1931
Ship	State	Description
Theologos	Greece	The sailing ship foundered in the Aegean Sea off Laurium.

=== 8 November ===
List of shipwrecks: 8 November 1931
Ship	State	Description
Baden-Baden	Costa Rica	The auxiliary schooner foundered in the Caribbean Sea off Cartagena, Colombia with the loss of five of her sixteen crew. Survivors were rescued by USS Swan (United States Navy).
Pakri	Estonia	The cargo ship ran aground at Ristna Point, Hiiumaa. She was refloated on 13 November.

=== 11 November ===
List of shipwrecks: 11 November 1931
Ship	State	Description
Georgios M	Greece	The cargo ship foundered in the Atlantic Ocean (45°25′N 7°30′W) with the loss of eighteen of her 23 crew. Survivors were rescued by P.L.M. 22 (France).
Panama Transport	United Kingdom	The cargo ship ran aground in the Paraná River, Argentina. She was refloated on 18 November.
HMS Petersfield	Royal Navy	The Aberdare-class minesweeper was wrecked on Tung Yung Island, Republic of China (part of the Matsu Islands).
St. Ives	United Kingdom	The dredger sank in the North Sea (52°21′N 2°26′E) whilst under tow.

=== 12 November ===
List of shipwrecks: 12 November 1931
Ship	State	Description
Petrolea	Finland	The cargo ship caught fire at Hangö and was beached.

=== 15 November ===
List of shipwrecks: 15 November 1931
Ship	State	Description
Aranguren	Spain	The cargo ship was rammed and sunk in the Sea of Marmara off Khairsis Island, Turkey by Le Loing (Marine Nationale) with the loss of one crew member. The survivors were rescued by Le Loing.
Unione Secundo	Italy	The sailing ship was in collision with Christina (Greece) at Genoa and sank with the loss of a crew member.

=== 17 November ===
List of shipwrecks: 17 November 1931
Ship	State	Description
Alice Cook	United States	The 782-gross register ton schooner caught fire outside Johnstone Point (60°28′N 146°37′W) in Prince William Sound on the south-central coast of the Territory of Alaska. When the fire could not be controlled, she was beached and the cannery tender Francis (United States) took off her crew of nine men. Alice Cook became a total loss.
Ria	Dominion of Newfoundland	The schooner foundered in the Atlantic Ocean (35°58′N 38°10′W). All six crew were rescued by Aztec (United Kingdom).

=== 18 November ===
List of shipwrecks: 18 November 1931
Ship	State	Description
Itu	United States	The cargo ship caught fire in the Yangtze above Ichang, China and was beached. She was refloated on 23 November.
Lady Green	United Kingdom	The schooner caught fire off St. John's, Newfoundland and was abandoned. She was towed into port by Prospero (United Kingdom).
Pandelis	Greece	The cargo ship ran aground in the Dardanelles at Ak Bashi Liman, Turkey. she was refloated on 24 November. She was refloated on 24 November.

=== 19 November ===
For the loss of the British ocean liner Bermuda on this day, see the entry for 17 June 1931

List of shipwrecks: 19 November 1931
Ship	State	Description
Howe	United Kingdom	This steam trawler ran aground on the west coast of Bear Island. Her 15 man crew were rescued after a 60 hour effort by over 100 men from the fishing fleet.
Nambucca	United Kingdom	The cargo ship ran aground at Sydney, New South Wales, Australia. She was still aground on 24 November.
Pilgrim	United States	The 12-gross register ton, 35.2-foot (10.7 m) motor vessel sank in "Malina Strait" – probably a local name for Raspberry Strait (58°00′30″N 152°46′00″W) – off Afognak Island in the Kodiak Archipelago after her gasoline engine backfired, igniting a fire in her engine room that led to an explosion of her gasoline tank which blew out her port side. Her two of crew abandoned ship in a lifeboat and survived.
Planorbis	United Kingdom	The tanker ran aground at Balikpapan, Netherlands East Indies. She was refloated on 26 November.

=== 20 November ===
List of shipwrecks: 20 November 1931
Ship	State	Description
Mayals	United Kingdom	The auxiliary three-masted schooner was rammed and sunk at Milford Haven, Pembrokeshire by the fishing vessel Neves (United Kingdom). The crew were rescued.
Nautilus	United States	The decommissioned O-class submarine — the former USS O-12 (United States Navy) — was scuttled as a means of disposal in 1,138 feet (347 m) of water in the Byfjorden about 3 miles (4.8 km) from Bergen, Norway.

=== 21 November ===
List of shipwrecks: 21 November 1931
Ship	State	Description
Baron Glenconner	United Kingdom	The cargo ship ran aground at Point Judith, Rhode Island, United States. She was refloated on 27 November.

=== 22 November ===
List of shipwrecks: 22 November 1931
Ship	State	Description
Michael L. Embiricos	Greece	The cargo ship ran aground on Plane Island, Tunisia and was beached in Andaluses Bay. Thirty crew were rescued by Alaya (Germany). She was refloated on 28 November.

=== 23 November ===
List of shipwrecks: 23 November 1931
Ship	State	Description
Eleni	Greece	The sailing vessel ran aground whilst on a voyage from Salonica to Kavala and was destroyed by fire with the loss of a crew member.
Maraboe	Netherlands	The cargo ship collided with Sibier (Soviet Union) in the Kaiser Wilhelm Canal and sank. She was refloated on 26 November.

=== 24 November ===
List of shipwrecks: 24 November 1931
Ship	State	Description
Mary G II	United States	The 34-gross register ton fishing vessel was destroyed near Coffman Island (56°01′45″N 132°50′30″W) at the entrance to Lake Bay (56°02′N 132°58′W) on the northeast coast of Prince of Wales Island in the Alexander Archipelago in Southeast Alaska by a fire that began in her engine room when her gasoline engine's carburetor backfired. Her crew of two survived.

=== 25 November ===
List of shipwrecks: 25 November 1931
Ship	State	Description
Edith and Elinor	United States	The schooner collided with Gypsum Prince (United Kingdom) in the Atlantic Ocean off the Baccaro Lighthouse, Nova Scotia, Canada and sank with the loss of six of her nineteen crew.
Sanokawa Maru No.2	Japan	The cargo ship ran aground at Hirado, Nagasaki. She was refloated on 5 December.

=== 27 November ===
List of shipwrecks: 27 November 1931
Ship	State	Description
Duke of Lancaster	United Kingdom	The passenger ship caught fire in Heysham Harbour, Lancashire. She capsized on 28 November. Duke of Lancaster was raised in January 1932, repaired and returned to service.

=== 28 November ===
List of shipwrecks: 28 November 1931
Ship	State	Description
Alameda	United States	The cargo liner caught fire at Seattle, Washington and was a total loss.

=== 29 November ===
List of shipwrecks: 29 November 1931
Ship	State	Description
Mildburg	Germany	The cargo ship ran aground on Öland, Sweden. She was refloated on 21 December.
River Ribble	United Kingdom	The cargo ship collided with Selby (United Kingdom) at Hamburg, Germany, and was beached at Altona. She was refloated the next day. Selby was severely damaged.

== December ==
=== 1 December ===
List of shipwrecks: 1 December 1931
Ship	State	Description
Victoria	Germany	The cargo ship ran aground in lake Mälaren, Sweden. She was refloated on 7 December.

=== 3 December ===
List of shipwrecks: 3 December 1931
Ship	State	Description
Pasages	United Kingdom	The 126-foot (38 m), 271-ton fishing trawler, a sold off Castle-class naval trawler, ran aground in a gale on Jurby Head, the Isle of Man, became a total loss.

=== 4 December ===
List of shipwrecks: 4 December 1931
Ship	State	Description
Betty	Sweden	The auxiliary three-masted schooner ran aground near Oxelosund. She refloated but subsequently foundered.
East Anglia	United Kingdom	The Thames barge was struck by another Thames barge, Edgar Scholey, in the River Thames at Erith, Kent and sank. She was refloated the next day.

=== 5 December ===
List of shipwrecks: 5 December 1931
Ship	State	Description
Kwanan Maru	Japan	The cargo ship ran aground on the north east coast of Formosa. She broke in two on 10 December, with the stern section sinking. Kwanan Maru was declared a total loss.

=== 6 December ===
List of shipwrecks: 6 December 1931
Ship	State	Description
Egitto	Italy	The cargo ship ran aground at Alexandria, Egypt and was beached. She was refloated on 10 December and later drydocked for repairs.
Fushiki Maru	Japan	The ship ran aground on Quelpart, Korea. The passengers and crew were taken off.

=== 7 December ===
List of shipwrecks: 7 December 1931
Ship	State	Description
Inga	Sweden	The cargo ship came ashore at Vano Kalkskar and was wrecked with the loss of a crew member.

=== 8 December ===
List of shipwrecks: 8 December 1931
Ship	State	Description
Ferrol	United Kingdom	The sold off Canadian TR/Castle class trawler ran aground on Crianan Head, 3 miles west of Tuipan Head Lighthouse, Eye Peninsula, Isle of Lewis. She sank with only the wheelhouse and funnel above water, a Total Loss. Crew evacuated by line.
Marjan	Yugoslavia	The cargo ship ran aground at Medulin. She was refloated on 22 December.

=== 9 December ===
List of shipwrecks: 9 December 1931
Ship	State	Description
Grete	Denmark	The schooner sprang a leak and sank in the Baltic Sea off Falsterbo, Skåne County, Sweden. The crew were rescued.

=== 13 December ===
List of shipwrecks: 13 December 1931
Ship	State	Description
Georgios Paleocrassis	Greece	The cargo ship ran aground at Gallipoli, Turkey and was abandoned. She was declared a total loss on 15 December.
Teseo	Italian Navy	The tug foundered in the Tyrrhenian Sea off Sardinia, Italy, with the loss of all 36 crew.

=== 14 December ===
List of shipwrecks: 14 December 1931
Ship	State	Description
Asta	Sweden	The cargo ship ran aground at Falsterbo, Skåne County. She was refloated on 21 December.
Ta Te	China	The passenger ship caught fire in the Yangtze 40 nautical miles (74 km) from Shanghai and sank with the loss of twenty of the approximately 300 people on board.

=== 16 December ===
List of shipwrecks: 16 December 1931
Ship	State	Description
Admiral Beatty	United Kingdom	The schooner was driven ashore on Grand Turk and was wrecked.
Gertrude	United Kingdom	The Thames barge collided with Havel (Germany) in the River Thames at Barking, Essex and sank.
Lukas	Estonia	The schooner collided with a breakwater at Liepāja, Latvia and sank with the loss of all hands.

=== 18 December ===
List of shipwrecks: 18 December 1931
Ship	State	Description
Ferrol	United Kingdom	The 125.7-foot (38.3 m), 271-ton steam trawler, a sold off Castle-class naval trawler, was wrecked on Crianan Head 3 miles (4.8 km) west of Tiumpan Head Lighthouse, Eye Peninsula, Isle of Lewis. The crew made it to shore.

=== 19 December ===
List of shipwrecks: 19 December 1931
Ship	State	Description
Eland	Netherlands	The coaster struck a rock at Tønsberg, Norway. An attempt was made to beach her but she foundered. She was refloated on 23 December.
Newton Elm	United Kingdom	The cargo ship ran aground at Crescent Head, New South Wales, Australia. She was refloated on 28 December but was found to be extensively damaged.
Regina	Finland	The auxiliary schooner ran aground on Middelgrunden, Øresund. She was refloated on 24 December.

=== 21 December ===
List of shipwrecks: 21 December 1931
Ship	State	Description
Lucas	United Kingdom	The tug capsized and sank in the River Ribble at Preston, Lancashire whilst assisting to refloat Fido (Norway). The crew were rescued. She was refloated on 23 December.
Segovia	United States	The almost completed United Fruit Company refrigerated cargo liner was destroyed by fire at Newport News, Virginia. The ship was rebuilt and renamed Peten and later Jamaica operating for United Fruit Company.

=== 24 December ===
List of shipwrecks: 24 December 1931
Ship	State	Description
Yayewara Maru	Japan	The passenger ship collided with Kwansai Maru (Japan) in the Kurushima Strait and sank with the loss of 50 lives.

=== 25 December ===
List of shipwrecks: 25 December 1931
Ship	State	Description
Bārtava	Latvia	The cargo ship ran aground near Liepāja. She was refloated on 25 January 1932.
Livonia	Latvia	The cargo ship was driven ashore at Lyserort. All 23 crew were rescued by Rota (Latvia).
Minnie	United Kingdom	The Thames barge was rammed by Hunterfield (United Kingdom) and sunk in the River Thames at Woolwich, London.

=== 26 December ===
List of shipwrecks: 26 December 1931
Ship	State	Description
Mariongoula	Greece	The cargo ship ran aground at Gedser, Sjælland, Denmark. She was refloated on 3 January 1932.

=== 28 December ===
List of shipwrecks: 28 December 1931
Ship	State	Description
Dos Esquis	Mexico	The cargo ship ran aground at Cabo Roio, Florida, United States. She was refloated on 6 January 1932.
Helga	Germany	The auxiliary schooner ran aground at Kungshamn, Västra Götaland County, Sweden. She was refloated on 4 January 1932.
Orion	Finland	The cargo ship ran aground off Helsingfors. All twenty crew were rescued.
Royalist	United Kingdom	The tug collided with American Trader (United States) in the River Thames at Woolwich, London and sank with the loss of seven of the eight people on board. She was raised the next day and beached at Charlton.

=== 29 December ===
List of shipwrecks: 29 December 1931
Ship	State	Description
Wenchow	United Kingdom	The cargo ship ran aground in the Yangtze 40 nautical miles (74 km) downstream of Kiukang. She was refloated on 5 January 1932.

=== 31 December ===
List of shipwrecks: 31 December 1931
Ship	State	Description
Danaos	Greece	The cargo ship ran aground in the Paraná River, Argentina. She was refloated on 10 January 1932.

=== Unknown date ===
List of shipwrecks: Unknown date December 1931
Ship	State	Description
Liro	Estonia	The cargo ship departed Hull, Yorkshire, United Kingdom for Tallinn. She foundered in the Baltic Sea with the loss of all twenty people on board. Wreckage from the ship washed up at Rybachy, Kaliningrad Oblast, Soviet Union on 30 December.

== Unknown date ==
List of shipwrecks: Unknown date 1931
Ship	State	Description
Alacrity	Australia	The tugboat was driven ashore and wrecked by a gale while anchored in Cockburn Sound, Western Australia.
Baychimo	United States	The 1,322-ton trading supply steamer was abandoned in ice in the Arctic Ocean in the autumn of 1931. According to one report, she remained adrift in the Arctic ice pack for 52 months before she finally disappeared early in 1934; other reports claim she was sighted adrift as late as 1969, resulting in references to her as the "Ghost Ship of the Arctic."
City of Taunton	United States	The 292-foot (89 m) cargo ship, a sidewheel paddle steamer, was beached and abandoned at Somerset, Massachusetts, on the west bank of the Taunton River at 41°42′39″N 071°10′33″W, just south of the future site of the Charles M. Braga Jr. Memorial Bridge, sometime during the 1930s. The wreck settled on the river bottom in very shallow water.
Ernest Renan	French Navy	The decommissioned armored cruiser was sunk as a target by ships and aircraft.
F. C. Pendleton	United States	The 145-foot (44 m), 408-gross register ton three-masted schooner burned and sank without loss of life in up to 45 feet (14 m) of water at 44°19′38″N 068°54′27″W while at anchor in Seal Harbor at Islesboro, Maine, sometime during the 1930s.
Gardner G. Deering	United States	The 251-foot (77 m), 1,982-gross register ton five-masted schooner was abandoned and later burned in Smith Cove off West Brooksville, Maine, sometime during the 1930s. Her wreck settled in (10 to 30 feet (3.0 to 9.1 m)) of water approximately 500 feet (150 m) off the north shore of the cove at 44°22′55″N 068°46′30″W.
Guy Thorne	United Kingdom	The 137.4-foot (41.9 m), 138-ton steam trawler was towed into Reykjavík on 3 March by the tug Magni (Iceland) after she went ashore at Skerjafjord, Vestfjorder, Iceland on an unknown date.
M S P Co. No. 1	United States	The 20-gross register ton, 36-foot (11.0 m) scow sank in the waters of the Territory of Alaska c. 1931.
Mildred Robinson	United States	The motorboat was lost at Madeline Point in the Territory of Alaska.
