= TSS Colleen Bawn =

History
- Name: Colleen Bawn
- Owner: 1903–23: Lancashire and Yorkshire Railway; 1923–31: London, Midland and Scottish Railway
- Operator: 1903–23: Lancashire and Yorkshire Railway; 1923–31: London, Midland and Scottish Railway
- Route: 1903–28: Drogheda – Liverpool; 1928–31: Holyhead – Greenore
- Builder: Vickers Limited
- Launched: 1903
- Out of service: 1931
- Fate: Scrapped 1931

General characteristics
- Tonnage: 1,204 gross register tons (GRT)
- Length: 260 ft (79 m)
- Beam: 35.7 ft (10.9 m)
- Draught: 15 ft (4.6 m)

TSS Colleen Bawn was a twin screw passenger steamship operated by the Lancashire and Yorkshire Railway from 1903 to 1922.

== History ==
She was built by Vickers Limited of Barrow-in-Furness for the Lancashire and Yorkshire Railway in 1903 and launched on 12 June 1903 by Mrs. Aspinall, wife of John Aspinall, one of the directors of the railway company.

With her sister ship TSS Mellifont she provided a passenger and freight service between Drogheda and Liverpool as a replacement for the paddle steamers Tredagh and Kathleen Mavourneen. In 1912 the other ex-Drogheda Steam Packet Company paddlers, Iverna and Norah Creina, were also withdrawn from service.

Passenger service between Drogheda and Liverpool was discontinued in 1914, but the Colleen Bawn continued on the route in freight service. She passed into the hands of the London & North Western Railway in 1922 and the London, Midland & Scottish Railway in 1923. The LMS passed the Drogheda-Liverpool route to the British & Irish Steam Packet Company in 1928, and the Colleen Bawn was moved to the freight service between Holyhead and Greenore. She was scrapped in 1931.
