= TSS Mellifont =

History
- Name: Mellifont
- Owner: 1903–23: Lancashire and Yorkshire Railway; 1923–33: London, Midland and Scottish Railway
- Operator: 1903–23: Lancashire and Yorkshire Railway; 1923–33: London, Midland and Scottish Railway
- Route: 1903–06: Drogheda – Liverpool; 1906–12: Goole; 1912–28: Drogheda – Liverpool; 1928–33: Holyhead – Greenore
- Builder: Vickers Limited
- Launched: 1903
- Out of service: 1933
- Fate: Scrapped 1933

General characteristics
- Tonnage: 1,204 gross register tons

TSS Mellifont was a twin screw passenger steamship operated by the Lancashire and Yorkshire Railway from 1903 to 1928.

== History ==
She was built by Vickers Limited of Barrow-in-Furness for the Lancashire and Yorkshire Railway in 1903. With her sister ship TSS Colleen Bawn she operated a passenger and freight service between Drogheda and Liverpool as a replacement for the paddle steamers Tredagh and Kathleen Mavourneen.

She operated from Goole on continental services to Zeebrugge and Antwerp from 1906 to 1912. The Mellifont reverted to the Drogheda-Liverpool route in 1912 when the remaining ex-Drogheda Steam Packet Company paddlers, Iverna and Norah Creina, were withdrawn from service.

Passenger service between Drogheda and Liverpool was discontinued in 1914, but the Mellifont remained on the route in freight service. She passed into the hands of the London & North Western Railway in 1922 and the London, Midland & Scottish Railway in 1923. When the LMS passed the Drogheda-Liverpool route to the British & Irish Steam Packet Company in 1928, the Mellifont was shifted to freight service between Holyhead and Greenore. She was scrapped in 1933.
