= Tredagh =

Tredagh may refer to

- an area and alternative early spelling of Drogheda, Ireland
- English ship Tredagh (1654), a 50-gun third-rate frigate, later renamed HMS Resolution
- PS Tredagh (1876), a paddle steamer passenger vessel
