= Société Anonyme de Gérance et d'Armement =

The Rothschild Bank founded the Société Anonyme de Gérance et d'Armement (also known by its acronym SAGA) in 1919 for the management of French state-owned ships.

== History ==
In 1920, SAGA operated the coal fleet of the Compagnie des Chemins de Fer du Nord, a railway company also owned by the Rothschild group.

Acquisitions:

- 1926 Compagnie des Bateaux à Vapeur du Nord
- 1934 Union Maritime
- 1935 Compagnie Franco-Africaine de Navigation
- 1939 Société Navale de l'Ouest. Founded to operate scheduled services to Algeria and West Africa.
- 1963 Société Nationale d'Affrêtements. Founded in 1916 by the Chemins de fer de Paris à Lyon et à la Méditerranée to transport coal imported from England. Nationalised by the French Government in 1937, the company was owned by SNCF but maintained its own management until 1963 when the company and its eight ships were purchased by SAGA.

Subsidiaries

- 1927 Angleterre-Lorraine-Alsace Société Anonyme de Navigation. This company operated services between Tilbury and Dunkirk. Later the English port was changed to Folkestone. All services were abandoned in 1936.
- 1929 Compagnie Chérifienne d'Armements
- 1957 Société Navale de la Sanaga (jointly with Péchiney),
- 1964 CETRAMAR (jointly with Chargeurs Réunis, Louis-Dreyfus and Union Navale),
- 1965 Normandy Ferries (jointly with General Steam Navigation Company). Later bought out by P&O Ferries to become P&O Normandy Ferries.

Between 1968 and 1982 SAGA withdrew from shipping services and now as part of Bolloré Investissement SA provides sea, air, and inland transport services.

== List of ships ==
=== Angleterre-Lorraine-Alsace Société Anonyme de Navigation ===
- 1927-1932 TSS Lorrain formerly the TSS Rathmore.
- 1927-1936 TSS Alsacien formerly the TSS Duke of Argyll.
- 1927-1936 TSS Flamand formerly the TSS Londonderry.
- 1927-1936 TSS Picard formerly the TSS Duke of Cumberland.
- 1934-1947 SS Twickenham Ferry operated as HMS Twickenham by the Royal Navy from 1940 to 1945.
- 1975-1990 MV Saint Eloi

== Directors ==
- Jacques Bingen 1935-1944
