= TrSS Londonderry =

History
- Name: 1904–1927: TrSS Londonderry; 1927–1937: TrSS Flamand
- Operator: 1904–1923: Midland Railway; 1923–1927: London Midland and Scottish Railway; 1927–1937: Société Anonyme de Gérance et d'Armement
- Port of registry: (United Kingdom)
- Builder: William Denny and Brothers, Dumbarton
- Yard number: 727
- Launched: 29 April 1904
- Out of service: 1937
- Fate: Scrapped 1937

General characteristics
- Tonnage: 2,086 gross register tons (GRT)
- Length: 330.5 feet (100.7 m)
- Beam: 42.05 feet (12.82 m)
- Speed: 20 knots

TrSS Londonderry was a passenger vessel built for the Midland Railway in 1904.

== History ==
TrSS Londonderry was designed by the Messrs Bilee Gray and Co, naval architects to the Midland Railway and built by William Denny and Brothers of Dumbarton. She was launched on 29 April 1904 by Mrs Tilney, daughter of Sir Ernest Paget, Chairman of the Midland Railway. She was the first ship equipped with Lodge-Muirhead wireless telegraphy.

She was requisitioned by the Admiralty in 1914.

In 1923 she came into the ownership of the London, Midland and Scottish Railway when they acquired the Midland Railway.

In 1927 they sold her to Société Anonyme de Gérance et d'Armement who renamed her Flamand.

She was scrapped at Altenwerder, Germany in 1937.
