= PS Norah Creina =

19th century paddle steamship

History
- Name: 1878–1912: Norah Creina
- Owner: 1878–1902: Drogheda Steam Packet Company; 1902–1912: Lancashire and Yorkshire Railway
- Operator: 1878–1902: Drogheda Steam Packet Company; 1902–1912: Lancashire and Yorkshire Railway
- Route: 1886–1902: Drogheda – Liverpool
- Builder: A. & J. Inglis Glasgow
- Yard number: 142
- Launched: 20 March 1878
- Out of service: 1912
- Fate: Scrapped in France

PS Norah Creina was a paddle steamship operated by the Drogheda Steam Packet Company from 1878 to 1902 and the Lancashire and Yorkshire Railway from 1902 to 1912.

== History ==
She was built by A. & J. Inglis of Glasgow for the Drogheda Steam Packet Company for service between Drogheda and Liverpool. Her arrival in Drogheda on Sunday 23 June 1878 was witnessed by a large crowd. The steam tug Black Eagle went out to meet her with some Boyne Commissioners on board. The Norah Creina grounded twice in the river, the tide only half in, and on the second occasion, the Black Eagle was required to tow her free. As she arrived at the quay, the steamers Tredagh and Lord Athlumney fired salutes of welcome from their cannons. On 12 September 1887, Norah Creina ran aground in the River Boyne. She was on a voyage from Drogheda to Liverpool.

She transferred to the Lancashire and Yorkshire Railway in 1902 when they took over the business of the Drogheda company. Unlike the Tredagh and Kathleen Mavourneen, which were scrapped following the arrival of the new screw steamers Colleen Bawn and Mellifont in 1903, the Norah Creina and Iverna remained in service until they were sold for scrap in 1912.

In April 1912 the Norah Creina was sold and scrapped in France.
