= SS Rawcliffe =

Steamship

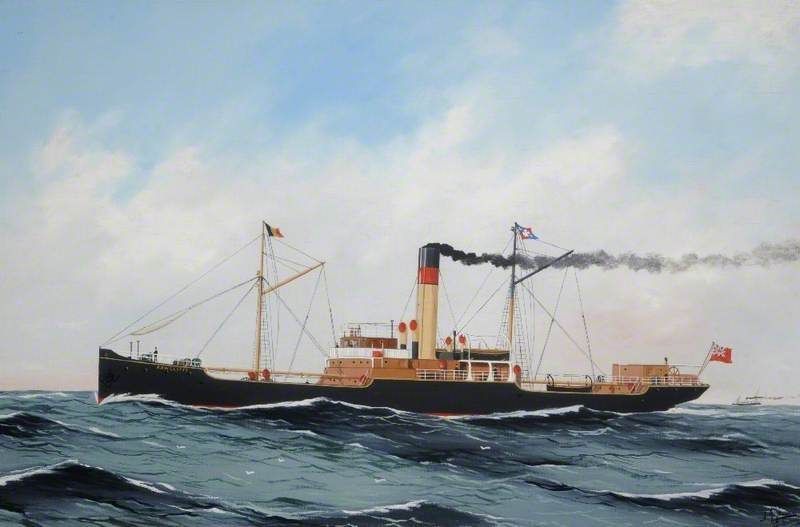
- SS Rawcliffe, by A. J. Jansen

History
- Name: 1911–1932: SS Rawcliffe
- Operator: 1906: Weatherall Steamship Company Limited; 1906–1922: Lancashire and Yorkshire Railway; 1922–1923: London and North Western Railway; 1923–1932: London, Midland and Scottish Railway
- Port of registry: (United Kingdom) Goole
- Builder: John Crown and Sons, Sunderland
- Yard number: 119
- Launched: 26 May 1906
- Fate: Scrapped 1931

General characteristics
- Tonnage: 866 gross register tons (GRT)
- Length: 215.0 ft (65.5 m)
- Beam: 32.6 ft (9.9 m)
- Draught: 12.8 ft (3.9 m)

SS Rawcliffe was a cargo steamship built for the Weatherall Steamship Company in 1906.

== History ==
The ship was built by John Crown and Sons at Sunderland. She was ready for sailing by the end of June 1906.

The Lancashire and Yorkshire Railway bought it shortly after completion in 1906. In 1922 she transferred to the London and North Western Railway and in 1923 to the London, Midland and Scottish Railway.

She was disposed of by the London, Midland and Scottish Railway when they acquired new vessels and scrapped at Bo'ness in December 1931.
