= Drogheda Steam Packet Company =

- House flag
- Industry: Shipping
- Founded: July 1825
- Defunct: 1902
- Fate: Taken over
- Successor: Lancashire and Yorkshire Railway
- Headquarters: Drogheda
- Area served: Drogheda, Liverpool

The Drogheda Steam Packet Company was founded in 1826 as the Drogheda Paddle Steamship Co. It provided shipping services between Drogheda and Liverpool from 1825 to 1902, in which year it was taken over by the Lancashire and Yorkshire Railway.

== History ==
The company was founded in July 1825 with the issue of 300 shares at £50 each. It was founded as the Drogheda Paddle Steamship Co.

The board of directors included Robert Pentland, mayor of Drogheda, John Leslie Foster, the MP for County Louth, Blayney T. Balfour, St. George Smith, James McCann, Patrick Ternan, Nathaniel Hill, Patrick Boylan, John Woolsey and William Rodger.

On 13 November 1826, PS Town of Drogheda arrived from Scotland. She made her maiden voyage to Liverpool on 26 November in 14 hours. Until 1829 a weekly service was operated sailing from Drogheda on Fridays and returning on Tuesdays under its master, Captain M. Ownes. She was employed until 1846, when she was sold.

In 1829, the company temporarily chartered the PS Liffey and PS Mersey from the City of Dublin Steam Packet Company to increase the sailings to three per week. These were sent back when the new ship, PS Fair Trader was delivered at the end of the year.

Further expansion in the 1830s saw the arrival of PS Green Isle the PS Irishman and PS Grainne Ueile.

PS Faugh-a-Ballagh was acquired in 1844, the first iron-hulled vessel. This was followed by PS Brian Boroimhe and PS St. Patrick in 1846.

== Closure ==
In 1902 the assets of the company were taken over by the Lancashire and Yorkshire Railway for the sum of £80,000 (equivalent to £8,501,594 in 2025),

== House flag ==
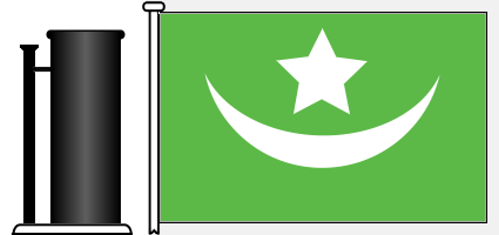
House Flag DSPC

House Flag as seen in the 1882 edition of the Lloyd's Codes Of Distinguishing Flags Of The Steamship Owners Of the United Kingdom. Another version shows a larger Arc.

== Vessels ==
Ship	Launched	Tonnage (GRT)	Notes
Black Eagle	1851	89	Harbour Tug, official number 16836, Built in South Shields. Acquired in 1858. Put up for sale 1894, register closed 1899.
Brian Boroimhe	1846.	649	Brian Boroimhe, Official Number 16804, Iron Paddle Steamer, Built by Robert Napier, Govan for passenger/cargo service between Drogheda and Liverpool, service 1846 to 1880.
Colleen Bawn	1862	609 or 679	Built by Randolph, Elder & Co Ltd, Govan in 1862. Scrapped at Preston, Lancashire in 1901.
Fair Trader	1829	200	Built by John Scott & Sons Ltd, Greenock. Bought new in 1829.
Faugh-a-Ballagh	1844.		Sold in 1879.
Grainne Ueile	1835	245	Built by John Scott & Sons, Greenock. Caught fire on 14 April 1847 north of Lambay Island. A total of 22 people killed, 68 rescued by fishing smack Bessy of Ringsend.
Green Isle	1833	213	Built by John Scott & Sons, Greenock. Sold in 1845, scrapped in 1853.
Irishman	1834		Built by John Scott & Sons, Greenock.
Iverna	1895	995	Taken over by the Lancashire and Yorkshire Railway in 1902. Scrapped in 1912 by Messrs Thos. W. Ward.
Kathleen Mavourneen	1885	988	Taken over by the Lancashire and Yorkshire Railway in 1902. Scrapped in 1903 in the Netherlands.
Leinster Lass	1849		Built by Robert Napier, Port Glasgow.
Liffey			Chartered from City of Dublin Steam Packet Company during 1829.
Lord Athlumney	1871	803	Built by A. & J. Inglis, Port Glasgow. Wrecked in 1888.
Mersey			Chartered from City of Dublin Steam Packet Company during 1829.
Norah Creina	1878	894	Taken over by the Lancashire and Yorkshire Railway in 1902. Scrapped in April 1912 in France.
St Patrick	1846		Used as a French troopship during the Crimean War.
Town of Drogheda	1826	185 (as built)	Built by William Simons & Co Ltd, Greenock. Rebuilt in 1835. Lengthened and increased in tonnage to 234 GRT. Sold in 1848, and converted to sail. Foundered some 100 nautical miles (190 km) east of Gibraltar in 1849.
Tredagh	1876	901	Entered service June 1876. Taken over by the Lancashire and Yorkshire Railway in 1902. Scrapped in 1904.
