= SS Spen =

History
- Name: 1908–1933: SS Spen
- Operator: 1908–1922: Lancashire and Yorkshire Railway; 1922–1923: London and North Western Railway; 1923–1933: London, Midland and Scottish Railway
- Port of registry: (United Kingdom)
- Builder: William Dobson and Company, Walker Yard
- Yard number: 161
- Launched: 6 October 1908
- Fate: Scrapped September 1933

General characteristics
- Tonnage: 900 gross register tons (GRT)
- Length: 215.6 feet (65.7 m)
- Beam: 32.3 feet (9.8 m)
- Draught: 12.9 feet (3.9 m)

SS Spen was a freight vessel built for the Lancashire and Yorkshire Railway in 1908.

== History ==
She was built by William Dobson and Company in Walker Yard for the Lancashire and Yorkshire Railway and launched on 6 October 1908.

On 20 June 1910 she was badly damaged in a collision with the steamer Willie just off Saxflee. She had to be beached until repairs could be made

During the First World War she was requisitioned by the Admiralty for services out of Newhaven. As a result of an encounter with a German submarine, her Captain, W. Allan received a gold watch.

In 1922 the ship was transferred to the London and North Western Railway and in 1923 to the London, Midland and Scottish Railway.

She was sent for scrapping in August 1933.
