= TSS Duke of Argyll (1909) =

History
- Name: 1909–1927: TSS Duke of Argyll; 1927–1936: TSS Alsacien
- Owner: 1909–1923: London and North Western Railway; 1923–1927: London, Midland and Scottish Railway; 1927–1936: Angleterre-Lorraine-Alsace
- Operator: 1909–1923: London and North Western Railway; 1923–1927: London, Midland and Scottish Railway; 1927–1936: Angleterre-Lorraine-Alsace
- Route: 1909–1927: Belfast – Fleetwood; 1927–1936: Tilbury – Dunkirk
- Builder: William Denny and Brothers, Dumbarton
- Yard number: 874
- Launched: 6 May 1909
- Out of service: 1937
- Fate: Scrapped 1937

General characteristics
- Tonnage: 2,052 gross register tons (GRT)
- Length: 331 ft (101 m)
- Beam: 41 ft (12 m)
- Speed: 21 knots

TSS Duke of Argyll was a passenger vessel operated by the London and North Western Railway and the Lancashire and Yorkshire Railway from 1909 to 1923. and also as Alsacien by Angleterre-Lorraine-Alsace from 1927 to 1936.

== History ==
She was built at William Denny and Brothers, as part of a fleet of seven ships delivered by the company between 1892 and 1909. The Duke of Argyll was part of the joint Lancashire & Yorkshire Railway-London & North Western Railway service between Fleetwood and Belfast from 1909 to 1922 when she passed into the hands of the LNWR alone. She passed to the London, Midland & Scottish Railway in 1923. Upon acquisition by Angleterre-Lorraine-Alsace in 1927 she was renamed Alsacien for Tilbury-Dunkirk service. She was scrapped in 1937.
