= TSS Duke of Cumberland =

History
- Name: 1909–1937: Duke of Cumberland; 1927–1936: Picard
- Owner: 1909–1923: London and North Western Railway; 1923–1927: London, Midland and Scottish Railway; 1927–1936: Angleterre-Lorraine-Alsace
- Operator: 1909–1923: London and North Western Railway; 1923–1927: London, Midland and Scottish Railway; 1927–1936: Angleterre-Lorraine-Alsace
- Route: 1909–1914: Belfast – Fleetwood; 1927–1936: Tilbury - Dunkirk
- Builder: William Denny and Brothers, Dumbarton
- Yard number: 873
- Launched: 9 March 1909
- Out of service: 1939
- Fate: Scrapped 19 February 1939

General characteristics
- Tonnage: 2,052 gross register tons (GRT)
- Length: 330.4 ft (100.7 m)
- Beam: 40.9 ft (12.5 m)
- Speed: 21 knots

TSS Duke of Cumberland was a passenger vessel operated by the London and North Western Railway and the Lancashire and Yorkshire Railway from 1909 to 1923. and also as Picard by Angleterre-Lorraine-Alsace from 1927 to 1936.

== History ==
She was built at William Denny and Brothers, as part of a fleet of seven ships delivered by the company between 1892 and 1909. The Duke of Cumberland was part of the joint Lancashire & Yorkshire Railway-London & North Western Railway service between Fleetwood and Belfast from 1909 to 1922, when she passed into the hands of the LNWR alone. She then passed to the London, Midland & Scottish Railway in 1923. Upon acquisition by Angleterre-Lorraine-Alsace in 1927, she was renamed Picard for Tilbury-Dunkirk service. She was scrapped in 1939.
