= SS Saltmarshe =

Freight Vessel

History
- Name: 1907–1931: SS Saltmarshe
- Operator: 1907: Wetherall Steamship Company Limited; 1907–1922: Lancashire and Yorkshire Railway; 1922–1923: London and North Western Railway; 1923–1931: London, Midland and Scottish Railway
- Port of registry: (United Kingdom)
- Builder: William Pickersgill and Company, Sunderland
- Launched: 9 May 1907
- Out of service: December 1931
- Fate: Scrapped 12 December 1931

General characteristics
- Tonnage: 930 gross register tons (GRT)
- Length: 215 feet (66 m)
- Beam: 32.3 feet (9.8 m)
- Draught: 12.7 feet (3.9 m)

SS Saltmarshe was a freight vessel built for the Wetherall Steamship Company Limited in 1907.

== History ==
She was built by William Pickersgill and Company in Sunderland for the Wetherall Steamship Company Limited and launched on 9 May 1907. She was purchased in the same year by the Lancashire and Yorkshire Railway.

In 1922 the ship was transferred to the London and North Western Railway and in 1923 to the London, Midland and Scottish Railway.

She was sent for scrapping in December 1931.
