= SS Frinton =

SS Frinton was the name of a number of Steamships, including:

- SS Frinton (1903), a Great Eastern Railway ferry
- SS Frinton (1942), a Frinton Shipping Line cargo ship
