= PS Iverna =

History
- Name: 1895–1912: Iverna
- Owner: 1895–1902: Drogheda Steam Packet Company; 1902–1912: Lancashire and Yorkshire Railway
- Operator: 1895–1902: Drogheda Steam Packet Company; 1902–1912: Lancashire and Yorkshire Railway
- Route: 1895–1902: Drogheda – Liverpool
- Builder: A. & J. Inglis Glasgow
- Yard number: 239
- Launched: 22 August 1895
- Out of service: 1912
- Fate: Scrapped by Thos. W. Ward 1912

General characteristics
- Tonnage: 995 GRT
- Length: 255 ft (78 m)
- Beam: 30.2 ft (9.2 m)

PS Iverna was a paddle steamer passenger vessel operated by the Drogheda Steam Packet Company from 1895 to 1902 and the Lancashire and Yorkshire Railway from 1902 to 1912.

== History ==
She was built by A. & J. Inglis of Glasgow for the Drogheda Steam Packet Company and operated between Drogheda and Liverpool. In 1902 she was transferred to the Lancashire and Yorkshire Railway when they took over the business of the Drogheda company. Unlike Tredagh and Kathleen Mavourneen, which were scrapped following the arrival of the new screw steamers Colleen Bawn and Mellifont in 1903, Iverna and Norah Creina remained in service until they were sold for scrap in 1912.

In 1912 Iverna was scrapped by Thos. W. Ward of Inverkeithing.
