= SS Berlin (1891) =

Freight vessel

History
- Name: 1891–1916: SS Berlin; 1916–1933: SS River Ribble
- Operator: 1891–1895: Yorkshire Coal and Steamship Company; 1891–1922: Lancashire and Yorkshire Railway; 1922–1923: London and North Western Railway; 1923–1935: London, Midland and Scottish Railway; 1935–1940: Associated Humber Lines, Goole
- Port of registry: (United Kingdom)
- Builder: Thompson of Dundee
- Yard number: 106
- Launched: 1891
- Out of service: September 1933
- Fate: Scrapped 1933

General characteristics
- Tonnage: 1,090 gross register tons (GRT)

SS Berlin was a freight vessel built for the Yorkshire Coal and Steamship Company in 1891.

== History ==
She was built by Thompson of Dundee. for the Yorkshire Coal and Steamship Company. In 1895 the company was taken over by the Goole Steam Shipping Company which in turn was acquired by the Lancashire and Yorkshire Railway in 1905.

In 1914 she was in Copenhagen at the outbreak of the First World War and it was decided to leave her there for safety. However, pressure for tonnage required that she leave that port in 1916 under disguise and she crossed the North Sea to Hull, where she was renamed River Ribble.

In 1922 she became the property of the London and North Western Railway and in 1923, the London, Midland and Scottish Railway.

On 29 November 1931, River Ribble collided with the British steamer Selby at Hamburg, Germany, and was beached at Altona. She was refloated the next day. Selby suffered severe damage.

River Ribble was sold to J.J. King of Garston and scrapped in September 1933 at Gateshead.

== Bibliography ==
- Haws, Duncan (1993). Merchant Fleets - Britain's Railway Steamers - Eastern & North Western Companies + Zeeland and Stena. Hereford: TCL Publications. ISBN 0-946378-22-3.
