= PS Kathleen Mavourneen =

History
- Name: 1885–1903: PS Kathleen Mavourneen
- Owner: 1885–1902: Drogheda Steam Packet Company; 1902–1903: Lancashire and Yorkshire Railway
- Operator: 1885–1902: Drogheda Steam Packet Company; 1902–1903: Lancashire and Yorkshire Railway
- Route: 1885–1902: Drogheda – Liverpool
- Builder: A. Jack and Co, Seacombe
- Launched: 1885
- Out of service: 1903
- Fate: Scrapped December 1903 in the Netherlands

General characteristics
- Tonnage: 988 gross register tons (GRT)
- Length: 260.5 ft (79.4 m)
- Beam: 31.1 ft (9.5 m)
- Draught: 15.4 ft (4.7 m)

PS Kathleen Mavourneen was a paddle steamer passenger vessel operated by the Drogheda Steam Packet Company from 1855 to 1902 and the Lancashire and Yorkshire Railway from 1902 to 1903.

== History ==
She was built by A. Jack and Co of Seacombe for the Drogheda Steam Packet Company for service between Drogheda and Liverpool. Ownership of the steamer was transferred to the Lancashire and Yorkshire Railway in 1902 when they took over the business of the Drogheda company. Upon the delivery of the new screw steamers Colleen Bawn and Mellifont in 1903, the Kathleen Mavourneen was withdrawn from service and soon after sold and scrapped in the Netherlands.
