= PS Tredagh =

History
- Name: 1876–1912: PS Tredagh
- Owner: 1876–1902: Drogheda Steam Packet Company; 1902–1912: Lancashire and Yorkshire Railway
- Operator: 1876–1902: Drogheda Steam Packet Company; 1902–1912: Lancashire and Yorkshire Railway
- Route: 1886–1902: Drogheda – Liverpool
- Builder: A. & J. Inglis Glasgow
- Yard number: 124
- Launched: 1 February 1876
- Out of service: 1914
- Fate: Scrapped in Preston

General characteristics
- Tonnage: 878 gross register tons (GRT)
- Length: 241.2 ft (73.5 m)
- Beam: 29.3 ft (8.9 m)

PS Tredagh was a paddle steamer passenger vessel operated by the Drogheda Steam Packet Company from 1876 to 1902 and the Lancashire and Yorkshire Railway from 1902 to 1912.

== History ==
She was built by A. & J. Inglis of Glasgow for the Drogheda Steam Packet Company for service between Drogheda and Liverpool. Ownership was transferred to the Lancashire and Yorkshire Railway in 1902 when they took over the business of the Drogheda company.

The name Tredagh is a corruption of the name Drogheda.

The LYR took delivery of two new screw steamers, Colleen Bawn and Mellifont, in 1903 for the Drogheda-Liverpool route. In 1904 the Tredagh was withdrawn from service and sold; she was scrapped that year at Preston.
