= Orwell (disambiguation) =

Orwell may refer to:

== People ==
- George Orwell, pen name of English author Eric Arthur Blair (1903–1950), who took his name after the river Orwell
  - Orwellian, the situation, idea, or societal condition that George Orwell identified
- Sonia Orwell (1918–1980), second wife of George Orwell
- Orwell, a pen name for the poet and hymnwriter Walter Chalmers Smith

== Places ==
=== Canada ===
- Orwell, Prince Edward Island, a settlement in Queens County
- Orwell, a community in Malahide, Ontario

=== United Kingdom ===
- Orwell, Cambridgeshire, a small village
- Orwell, Kinross-shire, a parish
- River Orwell, in Suffolk
- Orwell High School, Felixstowe, Suffolk, now part of Felixstowe Academy
- Orwell railway station, a disused station in Suffolk

=== United States ===
- Orwell Township, Otter Tail County, Minnesota
- Orwell, New York, a town in Oswego County
- Orwell, Ohio, a village in Ashtabula County
- Orwell Township, Pennsylvania
- Orwell, Vermont, a town in Addison County

== Other uses ==
- Orwell Prize, British prize for political writing
- Orwell Award, American prize for writers
- HMS Orwell, various Royal Navy ships
- Empire Orwell, a ship
- PS Orwell
- 11020 Orwell, an asteroid
- Orwell (comics), a fictional character in Marvel Comics
- Orwell (horse), a British Thoroughbred racehorse (1929–1948)
- Orwell (programming language), a functional programming language
- Orwell (video game), a series of simulation games
- Harry Orwell, the protagonist of the television show Harry O
- Orwell comma, a musical interval
- Orwell: 2+2=5, a 2025 documentary film
