= PS Norfolk =

British passenger ship

History
- Name: PS Norfolk
- Operator: 1900–1923: Great Eastern Railway; 1923–1931: London and North Eastern Railway; 1931–1935: D. Tweedie, Edinburgh
- Port of registry: (United Kingdom) Harwich
- Route: River Orwell
- Builder: Gourlay Brothers, Dundee
- Yard number: 194
- Launched: 25 April 1900
- In service: June 1900
- Out of service: 1935
- Identification: British Official Number 109880
- Fate: Scrapped 1935

General characteristics
- Tonnage: 295 gross register tons (GRT)
- Length: 184 feet (56 m)
- Beam: 24.1 feet (7.3 m)
- Draught: 7 feet (2.1 m)
- Propulsion: Paddles

PS Norfolk was a passenger vessel built for the Great Eastern Railway in 1900.

== History ==
The ship was built by Gourlay Brothers in Dundee as Yard No.194 for the Great Eastern Railway and launched on 25 April 1900 by Miss Janie Lyon. She was built of steel and with a double-ended hull, with two rudders adapted for steaming with equal facility astern or ahead.

She was built for local services between Ipswich, Felixstowe and Harwich on the River Orwell, as well as coastal excursions to Great Yarmouth. On 1 January 1923 the mergers required under the Railways Act 1921 came into effect and she passed into the ownership of the London and North Eastern Railway (LNER).

In February 1931 the LNER announced that Norfolk and her near-sistership Suffolk would not resume the River Orwell service after the winter break, as it had been making considerable losses. They were both sold to Dutch shipbreakers in April, though Norfolk was resold by the Dutch to D. Tweedie of Edinburgh for further service. This does not seem to have materialised, and she was finally sent for scrapping in the Netherlands in 1935.
