= PS Princess of Wales (1878) =

Clyde-built paddle steamer (1878 - 1896)

History
- Name: PS Princess of Wales
- Operator: Great Eastern Railway
- Builder: London and Glasgow Engineering and Iron Shipbuilding Company
- Yard number: 203
- Launched: 4 February 1878
- Out of service: 1896
- Fate: Scrapped 1896

General characteristics
- Tonnage: 1,098 gross register tons (GRT)
- Length: 265.5 feet (80.9 m)
- Beam: 30.4 feet (9.3 m)

PS Princess of Wales was a passenger vessel built for the Great Eastern Railway in 1878.

== History ==
The ship was built by the London and Glasgow Engineering and Iron Shipbuilding Company for the Great Eastern Railway and launched on 4 February 1878. She was launched by Miss Isabel Adams, daughter of the Locomotive Superintendent of the Great Eastern Railway Company, and named after the Princess of Wales, Alexandra of Denmark.

She was placed on the Harwich to Rotterdam and Antwerp route.

She was broken up in 1896.
