= Great Eastern Railway =

Pre-grouping British railway company

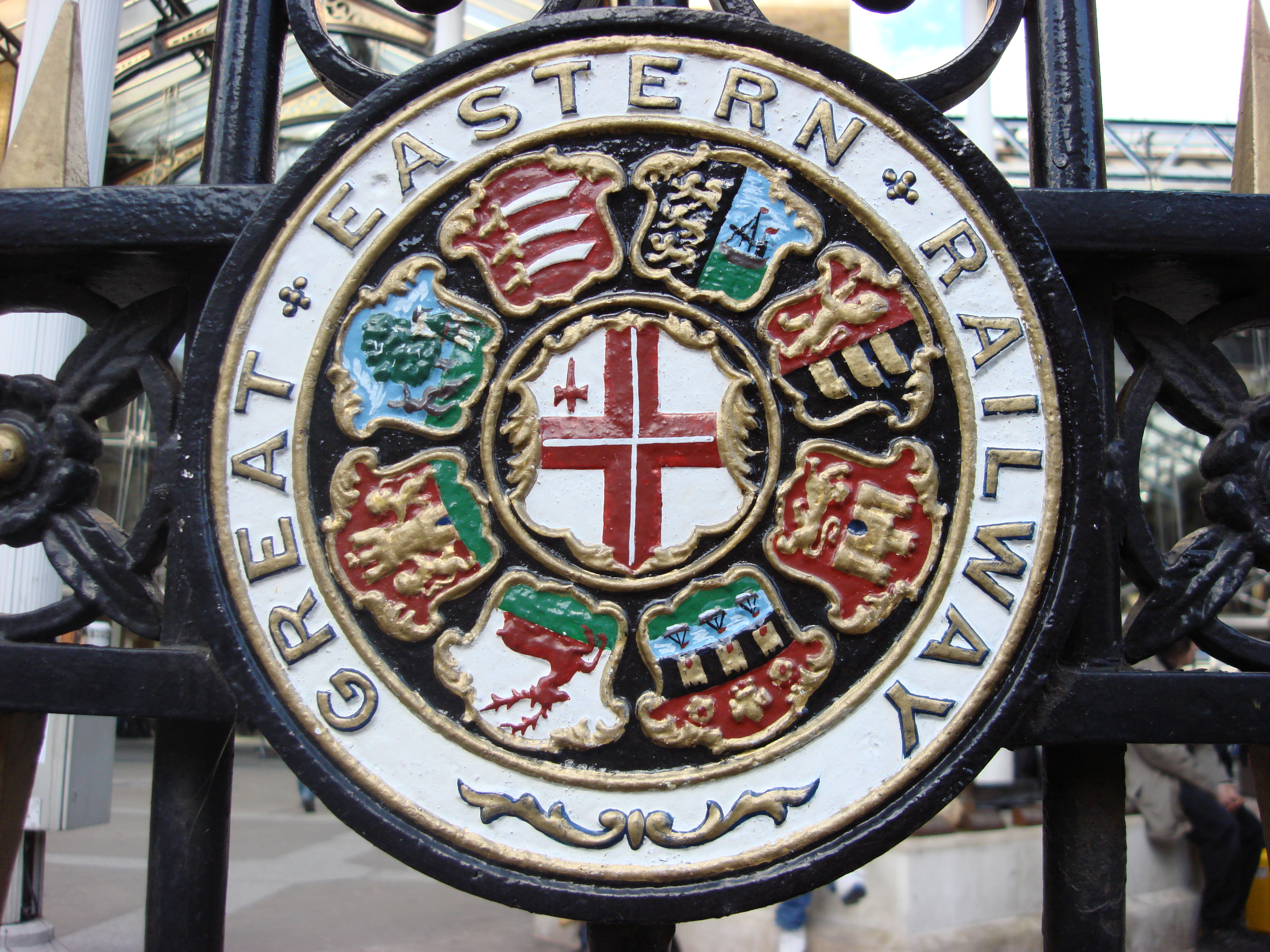

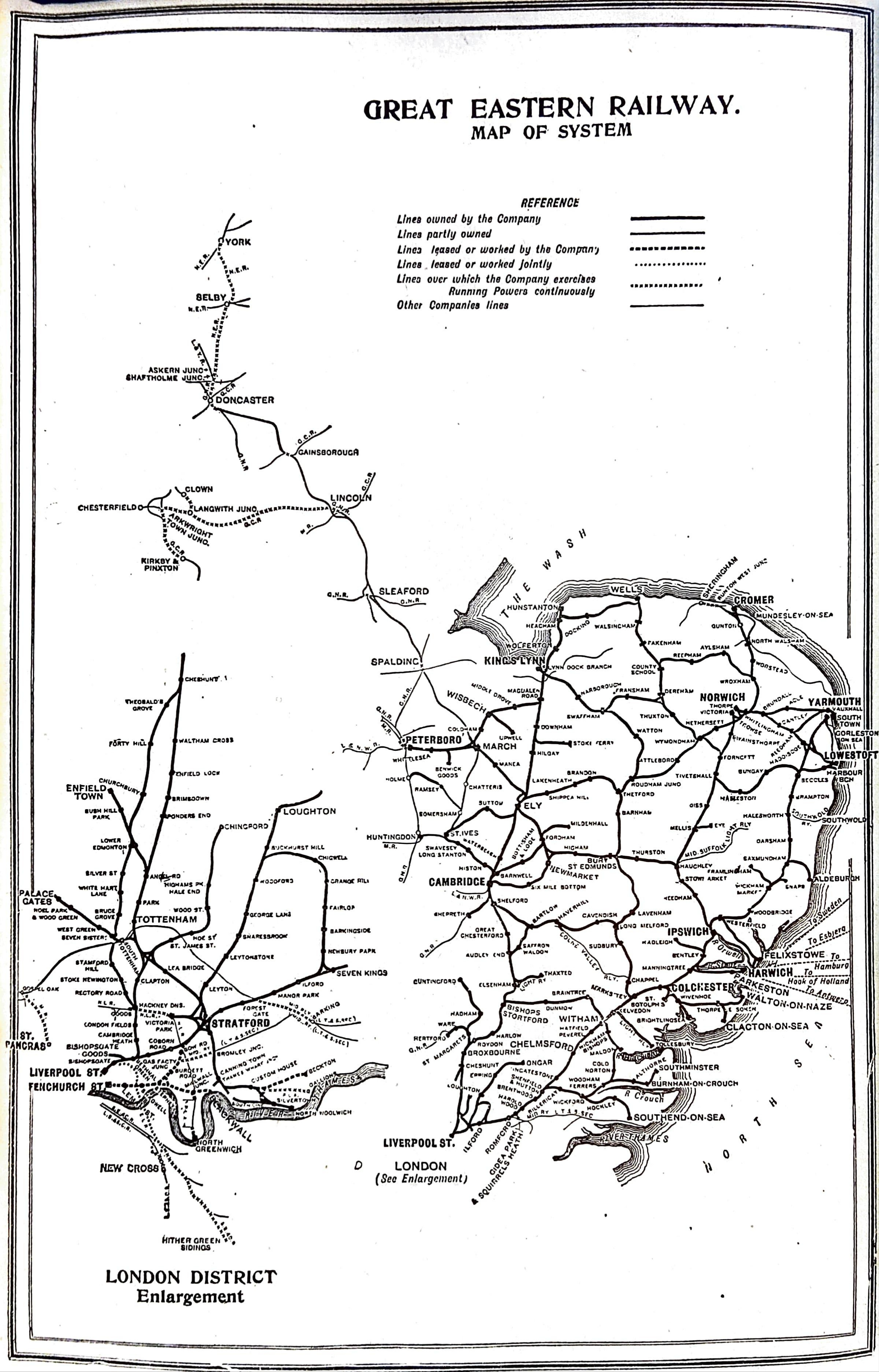
- 1920 map of the railway

Overview
- Dates of operation: 1862–1922
- Predecessor: Eastern Counties Railway; Eastern Union Railway and others
- Successor: London and North Eastern Railway

Technical
- Track gauge: 4 ft 8 1/2 in (1,435 mm) standard gauge
- Length: 1,191 miles 23 chains (1,917.2 km) (1919)
- Track length: 2,631 miles 24 chains (4,234.7 km) (1919)

The Great Eastern Railway (GER) was a pre-grouping British railway company, whose main line linked London Liverpool Street to Norwich and which had other lines through East Anglia. The company was grouped into the London and North Eastern Railway in 1923.

Formed in 1862 after the amalgamation of the Eastern Counties Railway and several other smaller railway companies the GER served Cambridge, Chelmsford, Colchester, Great Yarmouth, Ipswich, King's Lynn, Lowestoft, Norwich, Southend-on-Sea (opened by the GER in 1889), and East Anglian seaside resorts such as Hunstanton (whose prosperity was largely a result of the GER's line being built) and Cromer. It also served a suburban area, including Enfield, Chingford, Loughton and Ilford. This suburban network was, in the early 20th century, the busiest steam-hauled commuter system in the world.

The majority of the Great Eastern's locomotives and rolling stock were built at Stratford Works, part of which was on the site of today's Stratford International station and the rest was adjacent to Stratford Regional station. The GER owned 1,200 miles (1,931 km) of line and had a near-monopoly in East Anglia until the opening of the Midland and Great Northern Joint Railway in 1893 although there were a number of minor lines, such as the Mid-Suffolk Light Railway that stayed resolutely independent until after the grouping in 1923.

== History ==
=== Amalgamation ===
Between 1851 and 1854 the Eastern Counties Railway (ECR) under the chairmanship of David Waddington had negotiated arrangements to work most of the other railways in East Anglia resulting in a network of lines totalling 565 miles (909 km). Whilst Parliament favoured competition it was also aware that the ECR was constantly at war with its neighbours and whilst these working arrangements were approved there was a condition that a bill for full amalgamation was presented by 1861.

Waddington departed under a cloud in 1856 and was replaced by Horatio Love. By 1860 many shareholders were unhappy listing several grievances they saw as getting in the way of their dividend payments. These included continual conflict over working of other lines, suspicion and distrust of the joint committee, inadequate services to and from London, on-going litigation and law costs and a lack of progress on amalgamation.

Great Eastern Railway Act 1862
- Act of Parliament
- Parliament of the United Kingdom
- Long title: An Act to amalgamate the Eastern Counties, the East Anglian, the Newmarket, the Eastern Union, and the Norfolk Railway Companies; and for other Purposes.
- Citation: 25 & 26 Vict. c. ccxxiii
- Territorial extent: United Kingdom

Dates
- Royal assent: 7 August 1862

Other legislation
- Relates to: Navigation between Stowmarket and Ipswich Act 1846

Text of statute as originally enacted

By February 1862 the bill had its second reading and was then followed by a lengthy committee process where various parties petitioned against the bill. On 7 August 1862 the bill passed as the Great Eastern Railway Act 1862 (25 & 26 Vict. c. ccxxiii) and the Great Eastern Railway was formed by the amalgamation of the Eastern Counties Railway and a number of smaller railways (the Newmarket Railway, the Eastern Union Railway, and the Norfolk Railway).

=== Early years (1862–1869) ===
Unsurprisingly the first GER board had a strong Eastern Counties flavour with Horatio Love in the chair and James Goodson the deputy chair. The board consisted of six former ECR directors with two Eastern Union Railway, two Norfolk Railway and one each from the Northern and Eastern Railway (still an independent body at this point) and the East Anglian Railways.

Operational costs were high on the new railway and new sources of revenue needed quickly. Work at improving suburban services was put in hand and trains from London to Norwich speeded up to give businessmen and merchants more time to conduct their business. A new suburban line to Enfield Town via Seven Sisters was proposed as well as a new London terminus to replace an inadequate Bishopsgate. By August 1863 receipts were increasing and many of the pre-amalgamation disputes were being settled.

The GER and Great Northern Railway (GNR) each submitted bills for a line from March to Spalding and although the GNR was successful the GER was awarded running rights over the new line which would later become part of the Great Northern and Great Eastern Joint Railway. Steamboat services were also seen as a new source of revenue with services running from Harwich to Rotterdam, Flushing and Antwerp.

A change of leadership also occurred with Horatio Love being replaced by James Goodson as chairman with Captain Henry Jervis-White-Jervis as his deputy. Love was considered too cautious and some on the board still resented his role prior to amalgamation at the ECR. Various directors were allocated specific responsibilities (generally running these through committees) leaving Goodson free to develop new schemes and represent the GER on lines where they had a financial interest.

Following an accident at North Wootton in early August 1863, where the deaths of five passengers was partially attributed to the poor state of the rolling stock, a large rolling stock order was placed.

By December 1863 the financial picture was looking better and in early 1864 the GER started looking a new railway to move coal from South Yorkshire to London via Spalding and the GNR link from Spalding to March. The Great Eastern was clearly in an expansionist phase with further locomotives (forming the basis of standardisation over its disparate inherited fleet), carriages and wagons under construction. More ships were being ordered for Antwerp and Rotterdam traffic and proposals for 28 miles of new metropolitan lines and a new city terminus.

In March 1864, a joint committee of the House of Commons and House of Lords approved the East London Line which would link the North London, Great Eastern and London and Blackwall railways. The parliamentary bill for the new freight line failed although other bills including the construction of a new London terminus were approved. Later that year the GER was in talks about expansion northwards with the Lancashire and Yorkshire Railway (L&YR) which lead to the deposition of a bill in early 1865.

The board meeting of February 1865 saw passenger receipts outstripping goods receipts. Fish traffic from Lowestoft and Great Yarmouth was growing and money was being spent on stations, replacing wooden bridges and upgrading the track. However, a number of shareholders voiced concern. The following month the House of Commons rejected the joint GER/L&YR bill forcing the GER to restart negotiations with the Great Northern Railway. The chairman of the parliamentary committee suggested to the board that the next bill should include a direct Spalding to Lincoln link.

Board unity was about to be shattered when a short paragraph in The Times reported serious differences of opinions existed between the directors. In August 1865 deputy chairman Jervis-White-Jervis issued an appeal raising concerns about the management of the railway. This prompted an internal investigation and in a board meeting at the end of the month, an absent Jervis-White-Jervis was replaced by William Shaw as deputy chairman. The internal investigation concluded that many of Jervis-White-Jervis's concerns were relevant including borrowing more money than authorised and the poor deal the GER got on leasing the London and Blackwell Railway. In a meeting in January the following year many of the directors were duly replaced (by members of the investigating committee) and at the following board meeting in February, Charles Turner was elected as the new chairman.

The new board, facing a financial crisis, had identified a number of issues including the provision of a new terminus station at Liverpool Street, Bishopsgate (the existing terminus) was to be converted to a goods terminal and a new coal depot to be built in Whitechapel. The financial environment was still proving difficult with losses on the London and Blackwell line and a cattle plague seriously affecting that traffic. By March the board was meeting most days in an effort to keep the railway running.

The financial crisis of 1866 saw loan interest rates rise to 10% on 12 May. On 8 June the board approached Parliament for the right to borrow more money and raise additional money through new shares to fund the expansion programme outlined above. This was confirmed on 4 July. By this time there was little money available for dividends and the company looked very carefully at their expansion programme and unprofitable branch lines. By December 1866 little interest was being shown in the new shares, so the board went unsuccessfully to the Bank of England and Union Bank for further loans. The GER did, however, manage to agree running rights via the Great Northern Railway as far as Wakefield and with the Manchester, Sheffield and Lincolnshire Railway to interchange traffic at Lincoln and Retford.

The crisis continued into 1867 and by March it was apparent that the preference share payments due in April could not be paid. The board also received a letter from the drivers seeking improved working conditions. Additionally The Times suggested the GER may be about to appoint a receiver. Early April saw daily negotiations with the Union Bank although agreement was reached with the drivers by the middle of that month.

May saw the company trying to raise further funds via a parliamentary bill. However, by 25 June the House of Lords had rejected the bill and the board took steps to protect the company's property from its creditors. Matters were hardly helped when deputy chairman Samuel Laing resigned to become the chairman of the London, Brighton & South Coast Railway on 1 July. On 2 July a suit was bought before vice-chancellor Sir Richard Malins and the GER was placed into chancery.

Regrouping after this, the board pursued Edward Watkin, an MP with many other railway interests, as chairman. He did advise that the board that it needed to reconstitute itself in order to rebuild confidence in order to acquire new capital. Some existing members of the board were not pleased with this and it was not until 3 January 1868 that a reduced board of eleven members met with six new members including Watkin and Viscount Cranbourne MP who was elected as the new chairman.

The new directors were all allocated specific roles and a number of changes were made to reduce costs and improve profitability. Cranbourne also approached the London and North Western Railway to report on the state of the permanent way and rolling stock. By August 1868 the tide was turning with increased receipts and some debts being paid off. The GER had done a deal with the Midland Railway to route their coal traffic via their lines and a new coal depot at Whitechapel opened in December further improving profitability.

By August 1869 the financial position had improved enough to restore a dividend and this was whilst the Walthamstow line (now the Chingford branch line) was under construction. In the same month, deputy chairman Charles Turner resigned due to suspected fraud which was to lead to his bankruptcy later in the year. Although proceedings were initiated no prosecution resulted.

=== A new London terminus (1870–1879) ===
Great Eastern Railway (Northern Extension) Act 1878
- Act of Parliament
- Parliament of the United Kingdom
- Long title: An Act to authorise the Great Eastern Railway Company to raise capital for carrying into effect an arrangement with the Great Northern Railway Company with respect to an extension of their system to the railways of several other companies in Lincolnshire and Yorkshire; and for other purposes.
- Citation: 41 & 42 Vict. c. xc

Dates
- Royal assent: 17 June 1878

Text of statute as originally enacted

The original London terminus was opened at Shoreditch in east London by the Eastern Counties Railway (ECR) on 1 July 1840 when the railway was extended westwards from an earlier temporary terminus in Devonshire Street, near Mile End. The station was renamed Bishopsgate on 27 July 1847.

The Great Eastern attempted to obtain a West End terminus, alongside the one in east London, via the Tottenham and Hampstead Junction Railway, formed by an act of Parliament, the Tottenham and Hampstead Junction Railway Act 1862 (25 & 26 Vict. c. cc) of 28 July 1862. Plans to extend the western end of this line via a proposed 'London Main Trunk Railway', underneath Hampstead Road, the Metropolitan Railway (modern Circle line) and Tottenham Court Road, to Charing Cross, were rejected by Parliament in 1864.

A new London terminus at Liverpool Street was opened to traffic on 2 February 1874, and was completely operational from 1 November 1875. From this date the original terminus at Bishopsgate closed to passengers, although it reopened as a goods station in 1881. (Note: The Bishopsgate goods station was destroyed by a fire in 1964 which claimed the lives of two people.)

=== 1900–1914 ===
In 1902 the Northern and Eastern Railway was finally absorbed by the GER, although it had been worked by the Eastern Counties Railway under a 999-year lease taken on 1 January 1844 whereby the Eastern Counties Railway would work the Northern and Eastern Railway in return for an annual rent and division of the profits.

Despite several half-hearted attempts by the GER during the latter part of the nineteenth century, it was the Midland Railway (MR) that finally bought the London, Tilbury and Southend Railway (LT&SR) in 1912 with the MR offering a better deal for the LT&SR shareholders than the GER ever had. The agreement was ratified by the LT&SR shareholders on 26 June 1911. During the following parliamentary session, the Midland Railway (London, Tilbury and Southend Railway Purchase) Act 1912 (2 & 3 Geo. 5. c. c) allowing the takeover by the MR was passed on 7 August 1912 although it was legally backdated to 1 January 1912. At the time of the sale the LT&SR was one of the most prosperous railways in the UK but too small to fund the changes it needed to make.

In 1914 the GER became the first UK railway company to employ a general manager from overseas, Henry Worth Thornton. He had previously worked as the General Superintendent of the Long Island Railroad in the USA.

=== During the First World War 1914–1918 ===
The Railway Executive Committee was set up in 1912 after an incident between France and Germany in the Moroccan Port of Agadir and would take directions from the military and liaise with the railway companies. As it adjoined the North Sea the GER undertook a significant role in the war.

Had there been an invasion then the railways had evacuation plans for the civilian populations. The GER did require some upgrading to deal with the increased levels of traffic – lines were doubled, additional passing loops provided, platforms extended and watering facilities improved (for both the iron and more conventional horses). A number of link lines were provided including the link between the Tottenham and Hampstead at Gospel Oak to the Midland Railway and between the T&HJR and Great Northern Railway at Crouch Hill, Both links remain part of the national network in 2019.

When the war started several jobs fell to the railway – reserve troops and naval personnel had to be returned to their units and this saw an upsurge in usage of normal services. Various units were moved to the coast for defensive purposes and at the same time the government had started buying horses throughout the area leading to additional trains. There were also then the units that were being moved to the front line. The Royal Navy was using coal as its primary source of propulsion and additional coal trains would have been operated through the area as well.

In August 1914 the Germans disguised a passenger steamer (the Königin Luise) in GER colours and deployed it as a minelayer. This ruse was spotted on 5 August 1914 and the ship sunk by the British light cruiser HMS Amphion and destroyers HMS Landrail and HMS Lance.

The GER employed significant numbers of women during this period as many men had joined the army.

By 1916 unnecessary travel was being discouraged to conserve coal supplies.

The company set up a section dedicated to the movement of military traffic and between 1914 and 1918 nearly 10.5 million men were moved on GER services as well as significant numbers of horses and supplies. Specific military traffic was generated at Brimsdown, Ponders End and Stowmarket. Because of attacks on east coast shipping, traffic previously moved by sea was also carried on the GER (and more specifically the Great Eastern and Great Northern Joint Railway).

The GER also suffered from a number of Zeppelin attacks with, amongst others, the dormitory at Stratford engine shed and the royal shelter at King's Lynn both being hit.

=== After the First World War (1918–1923) ===
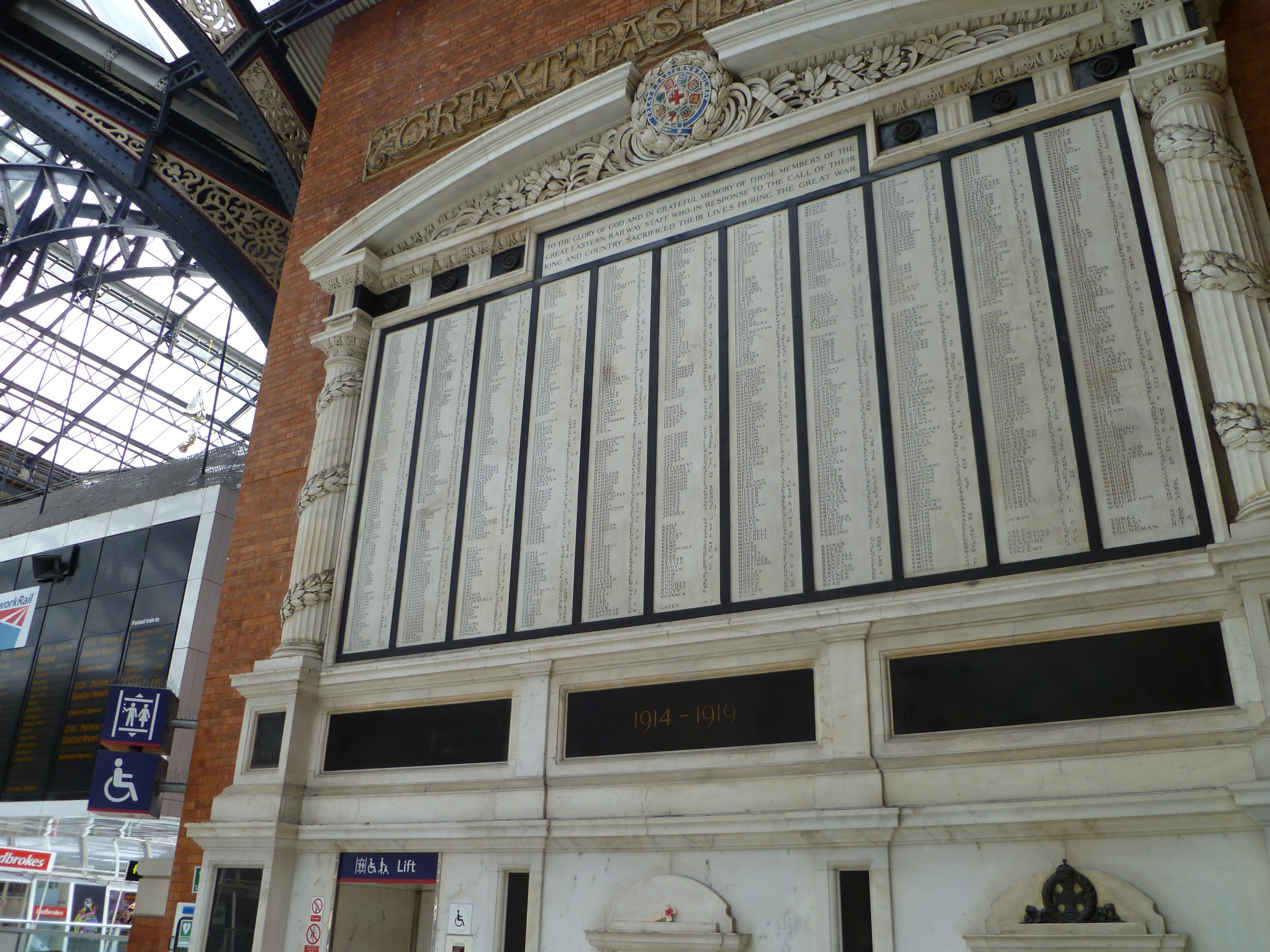
Memorial at Liverpool Street station to GER staff who died during the First World War, unveiled in 1922 by Sir Henry Wilson, who was assassinated by Irish Republican Army gunmen on his way home from the unveiling ceremony.

In 1922, a large marble memorial was installed at Liverpool Street station commemorating GER staff who had answered the call of duty to fight but died in action in the First World War. The memorial was unveiled by Sir Henry Wilson, who was assassinated by two Irish Republican Army gunmen on his way home from the unveiling ceremony. A smaller memorial to Wilson was later placed adjacent to the GER memorial, alongside one to Charles Fryatt, a British mariner who was executed by the Germans for attempting to ram a U-boat in 1915.

The Great Eastern name has survived, being used both for the Great Eastern Main Line route between London and Norwich, and also for the First Great Eastern train operating company which served much of the old GER route between 1997 and 2004.

== Constituent companies ==
The Great Eastern Railway was made up of a number of constituent companies when it was formed in 1862. The most notable was the Eastern Counties Railway, which had taken over most of the main companies by this time. After 1862 there were still a number of companies operating independently in East Anglia, but most of these were eventually taken over by Great Eastern, although some such as the Mid-Suffolk Light Railway survived until 1923. The history and exact status of many of these railways is quite complex. In many cases the operation of the railway that built the line was taken over (usually by the Eastern Counties Railway before 1862 and the Great Eastern Railway after that date) although the original railway company often existed in legal form after that date.

The Great Eastern Railway Act 1862 stated that the purpose of the legislation was "to amalgamate the Eastern Counties, the East Anglian, the Newmarket, the Eastern Union and the Norfolk railway companies, and for other purposes". This suggests that despite the fact that some of these railway companies had been taken over by the Eastern Counties Railway prior to the 1862 act, they still legally existed.

- BTR (Bury St Edmunds and Thetford Railway) – became part of the GER in 1878.
- EAR (East Anglian Railways) – taken over by ECR in 1852 but existed until the 1862 act
- ECR (Eastern Counties Railway) – was the principal constituent of the GER in the 1862 act
- EHSR (Ely, Haddenham and Sutton Railway) – although independent, the GER had a third share of its capital. The GER also provided staff, locomotives and rolling stock in return for 50% of the gross takings. Changed name to ESIR in 1878
- ESIR (Ely and St Ives Railway) – taken over by GER in 1898
- E&NR (Ely and Newmarket Railway) – built Ely to Newmarket line. Formed in 1875 and taken over by GER in 1898.
- ENR (East Norfolk Railway) – built many lines in East Norfolk – later vested into the GER
- ESR (East Suffolk Railway) – taken over by ECR in 1859
- EUR (Eastern Union Railway) – taken over by ECR in 1854 but existed until the 1862 act.
- FR (Felixstowe Railway) – line operated by GER from 1878 and taken over fully in 1885
- IBR (Ipswich and Bury Railway) – amalgamated with EUR in 1847
- LBR (London and Blackwall Railway) – leased by the GER in 1866, but remained independent until the 1923 Grouping.
- LDR (Lynn and Dereham Railway) – amalgamated with LER to form EAR in 1847
- LER (Lynn and Ely Railway) – amalgamated with LDR to form EAR in 1847
- LHR (Lynn and Hunstanton Railway)
- LIDR (London and India Dock Railway) – lines operated by GER from opening
- LRH (Lowestoft Railway and Harbour) – leased line to NR in 1847
- N&ER (Northern and Eastern Railway) – leased by the ECR in 1844, the N&ER lasted as a legal entity until 1902.
- NEW (Newmarket Railway) – purchased by the ECR in 1854 but existed until the 1862 act
- NR (Norfolk Railway) – formed when the N&BR and Y&NR merged in 1845, worked by ECR from 1848 existed until the 1862 act
- N&BR (Norwich and Brandon Railway) – merged with Y&NR in 1845 to become the Norfolk Railway
- RSJR (Ramsey and Somersham Junction Railway) – became part of the GNGEJR in 1897
- STJR (Stratford and Thames Junction Railway) – part of the ECR
- SAWR (Saffron Walden Railway) – purchased by the GER in 1877
- SVR (Stour Valley Railway) – taken over by EUR in 1848
- TEN (Tendring Hundred Railway) – vested into the GER 1883
- THJR (Tottenham and Hampstead Junction Railway)
- TSR (Thetford and Swaffham Railway)
- TWR (Thetford and Watton Railway)
- WHBR (Ware, Hadham and Buntingford Railway) – merged with GER in 1868
- WFR (Wells and Fakenham Railway)
- WSR (Watton and Swaffham Railway)
- WVR (Waveney Valley Railway) – taken over by GER in 1863
- Y&NR (Yarmouth and Norwich Railway) – amalgamated with Norwich and Brandon Railway into the Norfolk Railway 1845

=== Joint railways ===
- ELR – East London Railway, created by the East London Railway Company, a consortium of six railway companies: the GER, the London, Brighton and South Coast Railway (LB&SCR), the London, Chatham and Dover Railway (LCDR), the South Eastern Railway (SER), the Metropolitan Railway, and the District Railway. The latter two operated what are now the Metropolitan, Circle, District and Hammersmith & City lines of the London Underground. The GER had two seats on the management committee which met twice per year and the GER members were supported by the company secretary and a solicitor.
- GNGEJR – Great Northern and Great Eastern Joint Railway – a joint railway committee formed in 1879. It consisted of five directors from each company, met every quarter and the GER members were supported by the secretary, a solicitor, an engineer and the general manager.
- NSJR – Norfolk and Suffolk Joint Railway Committee – a joint committee formed with the Midland and Great Northern Railway
- T&HJR – Tottenham and Hampstead Joint Railway – run in conjunction with the Midland Railway.

== Geographical development ==
The table below shows the building dates of the railways that made up the Great Eastern and the companies that built them. Abbreviations from above list.

Opening date	Line	Opening company	Notes
1839	Mile End – Romford	ECR	Initially built to 5 ft (1,524 mm) gauge.
1840	Shoreditch – Mile End	ECR	Initially built to 5 ft gauge.
1840	Romford – Brentwood	ECR	Initially built to 5 ft gauge.
1840	Minories – Blackwall	LBR	Minories used as a temporary terminus – initially a rope worked line.
1840	Stratford – Broxbourne	N&ER	Stratford was on the ECR line – initially built to 5 ft gauge.
1841	Fenchurch Street – Minories	LBR	
1841	Broxbourne – Spelbrook	N&ER	To Harlow (July), to Spelbrook (November).
1842	Spelbrook – Bishops Stortford	N&ER	
1843	Brentwood – Colchester	ECR	
1843	Broxbourne Junction – Hertford	N&ER	Later named Hertford East.
1844	Norwich – Great Yarmouth (Vauxhall)	Y&NR	Route via Reedham.
1845	Bishops Stortford – Newport	N&ER	
1845	Newport – Brandon	ECR	First line to Cambridge – working of Ely – Brandon taken over by Norfolk Railway March 1846.
1845	Brandon – Trowse	N&BR	Open 30 June – bridge at Trowse unfinished.
1845	Trowse – Thorpe Junction	NR	15 December. Trowse bridge opened – through running from Norwich to London starts.
1846	Colchester – Ipswich (original station)	EUR	
1846	King's Lynn – Downham	LER	King's Lynn Harbour branch also opened same day.
1846	King's Lynn – Narborough	LER	
1846	Dereham – Wymondham	NR	
1846	Ipswich – Bury St Edmunds	IBR	The line did not serve the original Ipswich station directly – trains had to reverse into the station at Halifax Junction a short distance to the south.
1847	Ely North Junction – Peterborough Junction	ECR	
1847	Colchester – Hythe Quay	SVR	Freight only – leased to the EUR and operated by them.
1847	Lowestoft – Reedham	LRH	Leased to NR from opening.
1847	March – Wisbech	ECR	
1847	Stratford – North Woolwich	ECR	
1847	Thames Wharf branch	STJR	Opened same day as North Woolwich line.
1847	Narborough – Swaffham	EAR	
1847	Chesterton Junction (Cambridge) – St Ives	ECR	Later part of GNGEJR route.
1847	Huntingdon – St Ives	EAR	
1847	Bentley – Hadleigh	EUR	This is in Suffolk.
1847	Downham – Ely North Junction	EAR	King's Lynn to Cambridge and London, now a through route.
1848	Swaffham – Sporle	EAR	
1848	Great Chesterford – Newmarket	NEW	See below – possibly first passenger route to close in the UK.
1848	Watlington – Wisbech	EAR	
1848	St Ives – March South Junction	ECR	Later part of GNGEJR route.
1848	Haughley – Finningham	EUR	The first part of the link joining the Ipswich to Bury St Edmunds line to Norwich.
1848	Maldon – Witham	ECR	Witham – Braintree opened same day.
1848	Witham – Braintree	ECR	Maldon – Witham opened same day.
1849	Sporle – Dereham	ECR	
1849	Water Lane (Angel Road) – Enfield Town	ECR	
1849	Stepney – Bow Junction	LBR	Most trains only worked as far as Bow and Bromley with a few trains being extended to a short lived interchange station called Victoria Park & Bow which was located near the modern day (2015) Bow Junction on the Great Eastern Main Line. The line became part of the original LT&SR route from Tilbury via Stratford to Fenchurch Street in 1854 and GER services to Loughton also started operating on this route.
1849	Marks Tey – Sudbury	SVR	Leased to the EUR and operated by them. The EUR had running powers over the ECR route between Marks Tey and Colchester.
1849	Finningham – Norwich (Victoria)	EUR	Link between Ipswich and Norwich completed.
1851	Shelford – Shepreth	ECR	End on working with GNR allowing through trains between Cambridge and Kings Cross (London).
1851	Trowse Upper Junction – Trowse Lower Junction	EUR	This allowed EUR services from Ipswich to use Norwich Thorpe station rather than Norwich Victoria.
1851	Cambridge – Six Mile Bottom	NEW	Through route Cambridge to Newmarket now complete. This used materials from the closed Newmarket and Chesterford Railway.
1854	Newmarket – Bury St Edmunds	ECR	Through route Cambridge to Ipswich now complete.
1854	Manningtree – Harwich	ECR	Construction started by EUR but the ECR leased the EUR about one week before opening.
1854	Victoria Park (Hackney) – Stratford Market (North Woolwich line)	ECR	Link to NLR. Worked by NLR until 1866, then by GER one year and NLR the next until 1874 then GER and successors. Known locally as "the Stratford Jack".
1854	Halesworth – Haddiscoe	ESR	
1855	Tivetshall – Harleston	WVR	
1856	Loughton Branch Junction (Stratford) – Loughton	ECR	Now part of London Underground Central line.
1857	Wells – Fakenham	WFR	
1859	East Suffolk Junction (Ipswich) – Woodbridge	ECR	Opened same day as all East Suffolk lines listed below.
1859	Woodbridge – Halesworth	ESR	
1859	Saxmundham – Leiston	ESR	
1859	Wickham Market – Framlingham	ESR	
1859	Snape Junction – Snape	ESR	Freight only.
1859	Haddiscoe – Great Yarmouth (South Town)	ESR	Great Yarmouth – Ipswich through route complete.
1859	Beccles – Lowestoft	ESR	Lowestoft – Ipswich through route complete. Note ESR taken over by ECR on opening day.
1860	Leiston – Aldeburgh	ECR	Built by ESR but completed by ECR.
1860	Harleston – Bungay	WVR	
1862	King's Lynn – Hunstanton	LHR	Worked by GER in return for share of gross receipts.
1863	Bungay – Beccles	WVR	Taken over by GER on opening.
1863	Hythe – Wivenhoe	TEN	
1863	St Margarets – Buntingford	WHBR	Branch off the Hertford East line – operated by the GER from opening and taken over in 1868.
1865	Loughton – Ongar	GER	Now part of London Underground Central line as far as Epping. The rest is run as preserved line. Original station at Loughton abandoned.
1865	Shelford – Haverhill – Sudbury	GER	
1865	Haverhill – Colne Valley Junction	GER	Junction with independent Colne Valley Line.
1865	Bury St Edmunds – Long Melford	GER	
1865	Saffron Walden – Audley End.	SAWR	
1866	Wivenhoe – Weeley	TEN	
1866	Sutton Bridge Junction (Ely) – Sutton Bridge	EHSR	
1866	Wivenhoe – Brightlingsea	TEN	
1866	Weeley – Kirby Cross	TEN	
1866	Heacham – Wells	GER	
1866	Saffron Walden – Bartlow.	SAWR	
1867	Mellis – Eye	GER	
1867	Kirby Cross – Walton-on-the-Naze	TEN	
1868	Tottenham North and South junction – Highgate Road	T&HJR	An attempt by the GER to gain a terminus in the West End – Parliament terminated the line at Highgate Road, thus thwarting GE ambitions. The line, however went on to have a future with the Midland Railway – see Tottenham and Hampstead Junction Railway for further details – and for a few years some Great Eastern Cambridge line services were routed to St Pancras.
1869	Roudham Junction – Watton	TWR	
1869	Bishops Stortford – Braintree	GER	Completion of through Witham to Bishops Stortford line.
1869	Wapping – New Cross	ELR	First part of East London line.
1870	Lea Bridge – Shern Hall Street (Walthamstow)	GER	First section of modern-day Chingford branch.
1870	Lynn Docks branch	GER	
1872	Bethnal Green – Bury Street Junction	GER	opened in three stages. Gave shorter route to Enfield Town..
1872	Hackney Downs – Coppermill junction	GER	This route is now used as main route to Cambridge.
1872	Bethnal Green – Bishopsgate Low Level	GER	First part of line into Liverpool Street.
1872	Clapton – Hall Farm Junction (Walthamstow)	GER	Route used by present-day (2012) Chingford trains.
1872	Haddiscoe Spur	GER	Enabled through running from Yarmouth South Town to Lowestoft.
1873	Shern Hall Street – Chingford	GER	
1874	Bishopsgate Low Level – Liverpool Street	GER	Suburban traffic only.
1874	Custom House – Beckton	GER	
1874	Whitlingham Junction (Norwich) – North Walsham	ENR	Note C
1875	Watton – Swaffham	TSR	
1875	Liverpool Street	GER	Open to all traffic.
1876	Bury St Edmunds – Thetford	BTR	
1876	Thetford Junction – Thetford East	TSR	
1876	East London Jn (Bishospgate) – Wapping	ELR	Northern section of the East London Line.
1876	North Walsham – Gunton	ENR	Note C
1877	Gunton – Cromer High	ENR	Note C. Note also this is not the current Cromer station site.
1877	Westerfield Junction – Felixstowe (Beach)	FR	Extended to Pier later in year.
1878	Chingford (old station) – Chingford (present station)		
1878	Seven Sisters – Palace Gates	GER	Branch to Alexandra Palace – opened in two stages during year.
1878	Sutton – Needingworth Junction – St Ives	ESIR	
1879	Wroxham – Buxton Lamas	ENR	Note C
1879	Wensum Curve (Norwich)	GER	Norwich avoiding line.
1879	Ely – Fordham – Newmarket	E&NR	Built by Ely and Newmarket Railway but operated by GER from the outset.
1880	Chippenham Junction – Snailwell Junction	E&NR	Completed direct route Ipswich to Ely line. Trains had had to reverse at Newmarket in 1879.
1880	Buxton Lamas – Aylsham	ENR	Note C
1880	Limehouse Jn – Salmons Lane Jn	GER	
1880	Custom House – Gallions	LIDR	
1880	Aylsham – Cawston	ENR	Note C
1881	Cawston – Reepham	ENR	Note C
1881	Forncett – Wymondham	GER	
1882	Spalding – Lincoln	GNGEJR	Opened in two sections - through running from the GER to Doncaster and York was now possible.
1882	Reepham – County School	GER	
1882	Manningtree North Curve	GER	Harwich branch doubled in the same year.
1882	Thorpe-le-soken – Clacton	TEN	
1882	Stoke Ferry – Denver	GER	The Wissington Light Railway (an agricultural railway) had a junction with the Stoke Ferry branch from 1905.
1883	Breydon Junction (Yarmouth) – Brundall	GER	Opened in two stages.
1884	Wisbech – Outwell Basin	GER	Operated by tram type locomotives.
1884	Barnwell Junction – Fordham	GER	
1885	Fordham – Mildenhall	GER	
1886	Norwich Thorpe	GER	
1888	Highgate Road – Gospel Oak	THJR	
1888	Shenfield – Wickford	GER	Initially open for goods traffic only.
1889	Wickford – Southend Victoria	GER	Initially open for goods traffic only.
1889	Wickford – Southminster	GER	Initially open for goods traffic only.
1889	Somersham – Ramsey East	RSJR	
1891	Edmonton Jn – Cheshunt	GER	Known as the Southbury Loop.
1894	Liverpool Street (East side)	GER	
1896	Newmarket Curve	GER	
1897	Three Horse Shoes Jn – Burnt House	GER	
1898	North Walsham – Mundesley	NSJR	
1898	Burnt House – Benwick	GER	
1898	Felixstowe Town	GER	Direct route closed to Beach and Pier station at this date and all trains had to run via Town for these stations.
1903	Woodford – Fairlop – Ilford	GER	Remaining section part of LUL Central line
1903	Yarmouth – Gorleston – Lowestoft	NSJR	Provided a more direct route than the Haddiscoe spur.
1904	Kelvedon – Tollesbury	GER	Served dedicated station adjacent to GER main line station at Tollesbury.
1906	Cromer Junction – Roughton Road Junction	GER	
1906	Roughton Road Junction – Runton West Junction	NSJR	
1906	Roughton Road Junction – Mundesley	NSJR	
1907	Tollesbury – Tollesbury Pier	GER	Extension of 1904 line – passenger services withdrawn from this section in 1921.
1913	Elsenham – Thaxted	GER	Known as the 'Gin and Toffee' line.

Other railways

- NLR – North London Railway
- GNR – Great Northern Railway

Notes

- C – Operated by the GER from opening.

== Infrastructure ==
=== Stations ===
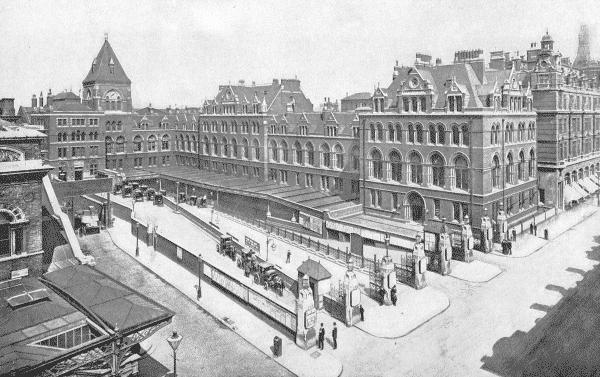
The exterior of Liverpool Street station (1896)

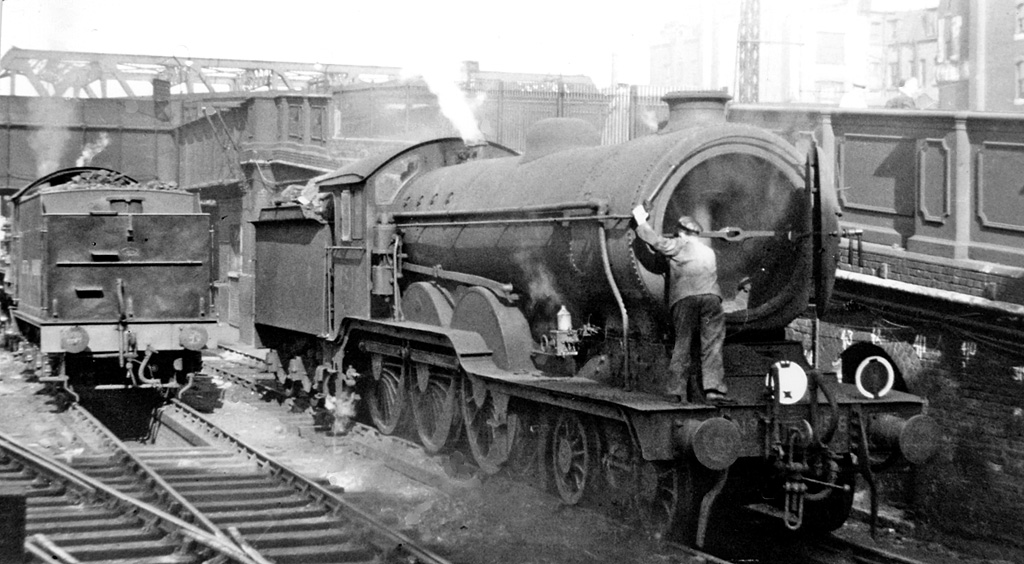
Former GER Class S69 at Liverpool Street Station locomotive yard (1948)

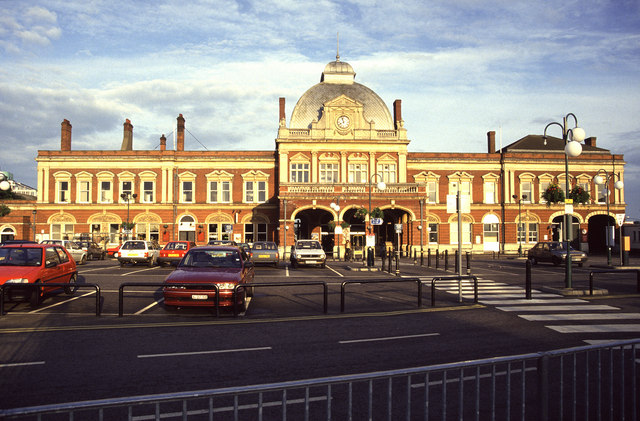
Norwich Station (1993)

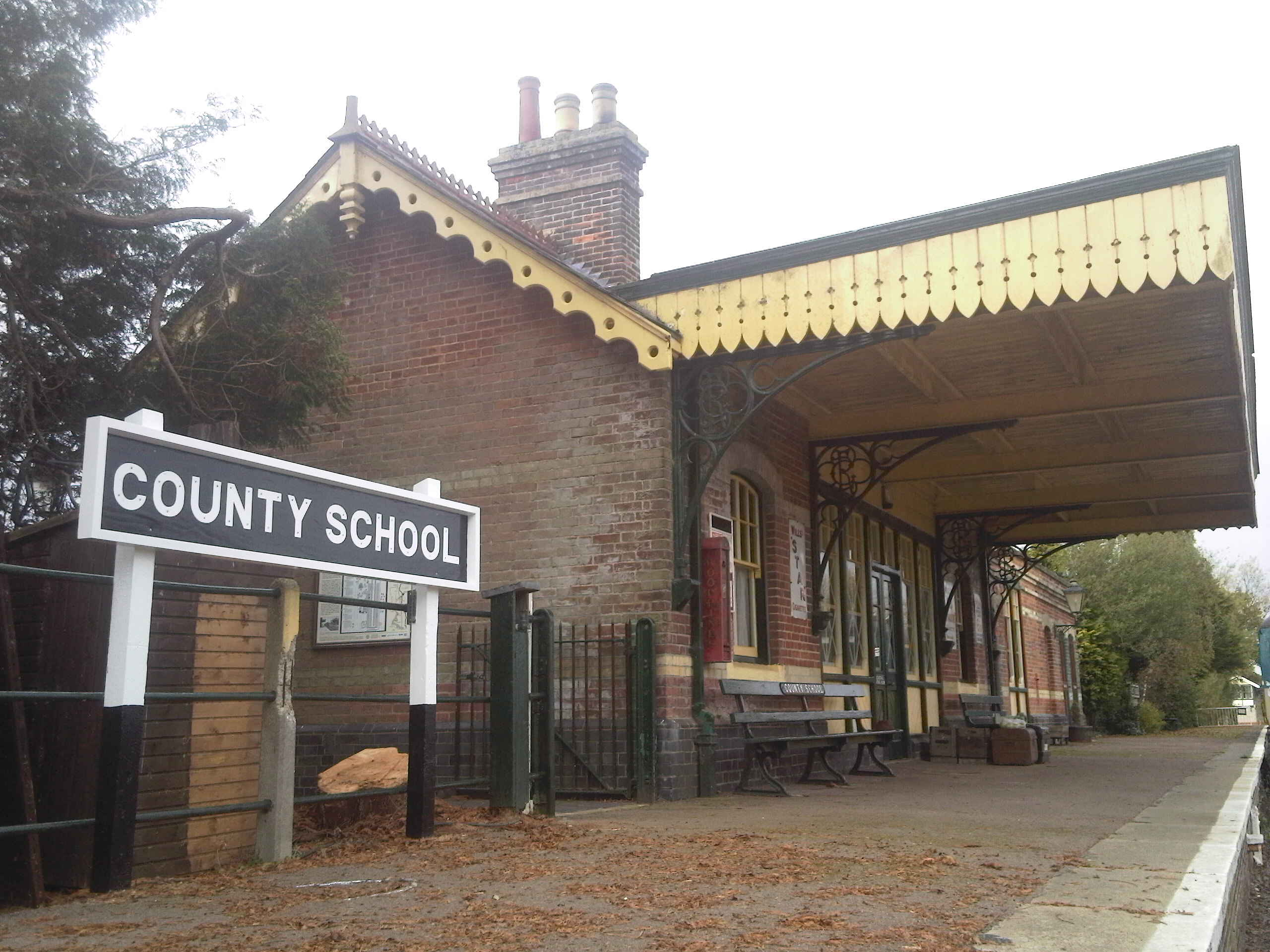
County School, a GER-built junction station (2008)

=== Engine sheds ===
The Great Eastern had one of the largest engine sheds in the country at Stratford which in January 1923 had an allocation of 555 locomotives. At the other end of the scale, small engine sheds at the end of country branch lines had perhaps one or two locomotives in their charge. At this time the locomotives were generally allocated to the major shed in the area and the smaller sheds had no actual allocation.

Before 1914 the engine sheds were organised into districts, with sheds at: Stratford; Ipswich; Norwich; Cambridge; Peterborough; King's Lynn; and Doncaster. In 1914 this was reduced to five with King's Lynn and Doncaster being abolished. By 1915 they were organised onto four districts (primary sheds in parentheses): Southern (Stratford); Eastern (Ipswich); Northern (Norwich); and Western (Cambridge/Peterborough).

The Great Eastern did not see the maintenance of engine sheds as one of its top priorities. Many original structures it inherited from constituent railways struggled on in various states of disrepair, not only through Great Eastern days, but through its successor company London and North Eastern Railway from 1923 until 1947 and indeed to the end of steam on the Great Eastern in 1959.

Coaling at engine sheds was generally done by hand with the coaling stages constructed of wood. At a busy engine shed such as Stratford, each individual coaler employed on the coaling stage was expected to empty the contents of a 10-long-ton (10 t) coal truck during his shift.

Turntables were generally small – in 1900 the longest was 50 feet (15 m) – enough to turn the later B12 Class 4-6-0 locomotive. By 1932, with the advent of bigger locomotives and the working of other companies' locomotives onto GE territory, turntables had grown, with the major sheds generally having 60-or-65 ft (18-or-20 m) turntables.

In 1922 the GER locomotive allocation across its sheds was: Cambridge - 178; Colchester - 47; Doncaster - 5; Ipswich - 131; King's Lynn - 37; Lincoln (Pyewipe Junction) - 12; Lowestoft - 22; March - 97; Norwich - 119; Parkeston - 20; Peterborough East - 86; Stratford - 555; Wisbech - 7; and Yarmouth - 20. Each main shed had a number of sub-sheds and locomotives would work from these sheds for significant periods. For instance it is estimated that some 150 engines were outbased from Stratford at any one time.

=== Works ===
The main workshops were located at Stratford Works and was responsible for the building of locomotives and carriages. Wagons were initially built here as well but as the railway grew a new wagon works was built at Temple Mills in 1896.

In 1894 a carriage painting facility was opened at Felixstowe Beach station which dealt with the painting of around 200 carriages each year.

Many engine sheds carried out heavier repairs. Ipswich engine shed for instance had a tube shop and a smithy containing eight forges and a steamhammer.

Another wagon works was located at Ipswich (adjacent to the engine shed south of the tunnel).

Stratford Works and Ipswich lasted until the 1990s but Temple Mills closed in 1983.

=== Signal boxes ===
The GER always allowed contractors a certain amount of freedom within their specified design, and three early types evolved built by Saxby & Farmer, Stevens or McKenzie & Holland. By 1877 the GER were consolidating their own design, which featured a gabled roof, with large overhang, and weatherboarding. Windows were always two panes high in this design. A more ornate style of construction replaced this type in 1882, but this did not last long – the GER was never a rich railway. By 1883 brick boxes were being built to a plainer design, although 1884 saw some ornateness returning. For instance, March West box contained mock stonework in the gables, fancy window design and decorated bargeboards.

By 1886 timber boxes were being constructed again as well as brick examples but this – with some variation – was the last design for Great Eastern signal boxes.

By 1997 there were still 90 of these in service, but with recent (2012) changes, and more changes expected, then it is unlikely that many will remain in service for much longer.

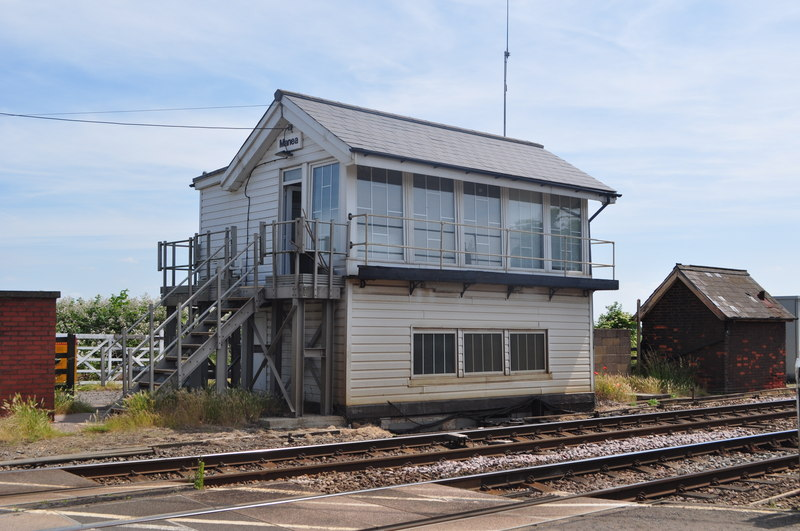
Manea signal box near March

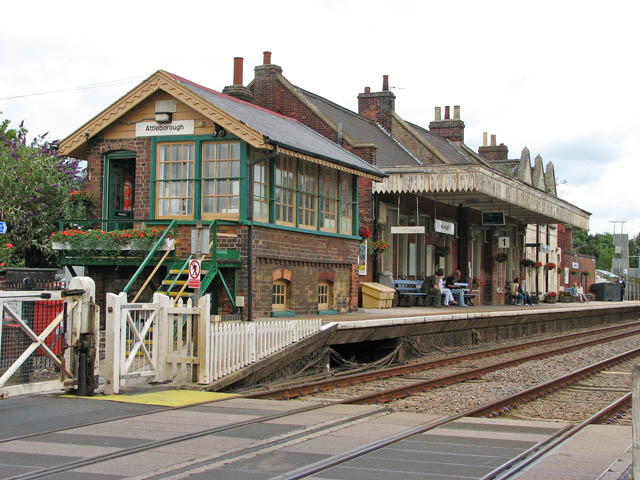
Attleborough Signal Box

== Operations and timetables ==
=== Main line ===
Over the years the principal main line services between Norwich and Liverpool Street were routed via Ipswich or Cambridge, generally depending on the quickest journey time available. Before the GER was formed its predecessor the Eastern Counties Railway had a reputation for speed second only to the Great Western and Great Northern Railways. From 1850 to 1855 Cambridge could be reached in 75 minutes (53.75 miles (86.50 km) from Stratford), a further 20 minutes to Ely (14 miles (23 km)) and a further 55 minutes to Wymondham (43.5 miles (70.0 km)) giving an average speed of 47.5 mph (76 km/h). There is some doubt as to the reliability of these times; as the writer Thackeray observed in The Lamentable Ballad of the Foundling of Shoreditch, "For even the Heastern Counties' trains must come in at last."

In the early days of the GER the 5 p.m. departure from Shoreditch (the terminus before Liverpool Street) took 52 minutes to reach Bishop's Stortford (average speed 38.5 miles per hour (62.0 km/h)) and 92 to get to Cambridge.

Because the route via Colchester had been built by a number of different companies, mostly in dubious states of financial stability, it was some years before the Colchester route rose to prominence. Then, as line speeds on this or the Cambridge line improved, the focus of the Norwich services would shift from one to another. On taking over the entire route in 1862, the GER improved speeds on the Colchester line so that Colchester was reached in 70 minutes (non-stop) and Yarmouth (via the East Suffolk route) could be reached in 3 hours 25 minutes. Norwich was 3 hours and 15 minutes via Ipswich and 4 hours via Cambridge.

In 1869 the situation had been reversed and it was quicker to get to Norwich via Cambridge (3 hours 30 minutes) compared to 4 hours 15 minutes via Ipswich. In 1870/1 the balance shifted back to the Ipswich route, with a time of 3 hours 35 minutes compared to 3 hours 53 minutes via Cambridge. By 1878 the Cambridge route was ascendant, with times of 3 hours 12 minutes for the fastest trains compared to a time of 4 hours 10 minutes via Ipswich. In the 1880s both routes had similar times, but by 1887 the Ipswich route offered a time of 2 hours 40 minutes which improved to 2 hours 31 minutes in 1897 and by a further five minutes in 1906.

=== Main line boat trains ===
Boat trains commenced running to Harwich Parkeston Quay in 1882 and were timed at 1 hour 45 minutes from Liverpool Street. By 1895 this was down to 1 hour 30 minutes. In 1897 the 8:30 pm train was run as two separate trains - 8:30 pm for the Hook of Holland and 8:35 pm for Antwerp. With the introduction of the corridor restaurant cars in 1904, the time was eased to 87 minutes, but the introduction of the Class 1500 4-6-0 express engines in 1912 saw a running time of 82 minutes.

=== Suburban services (the Jazz) ===
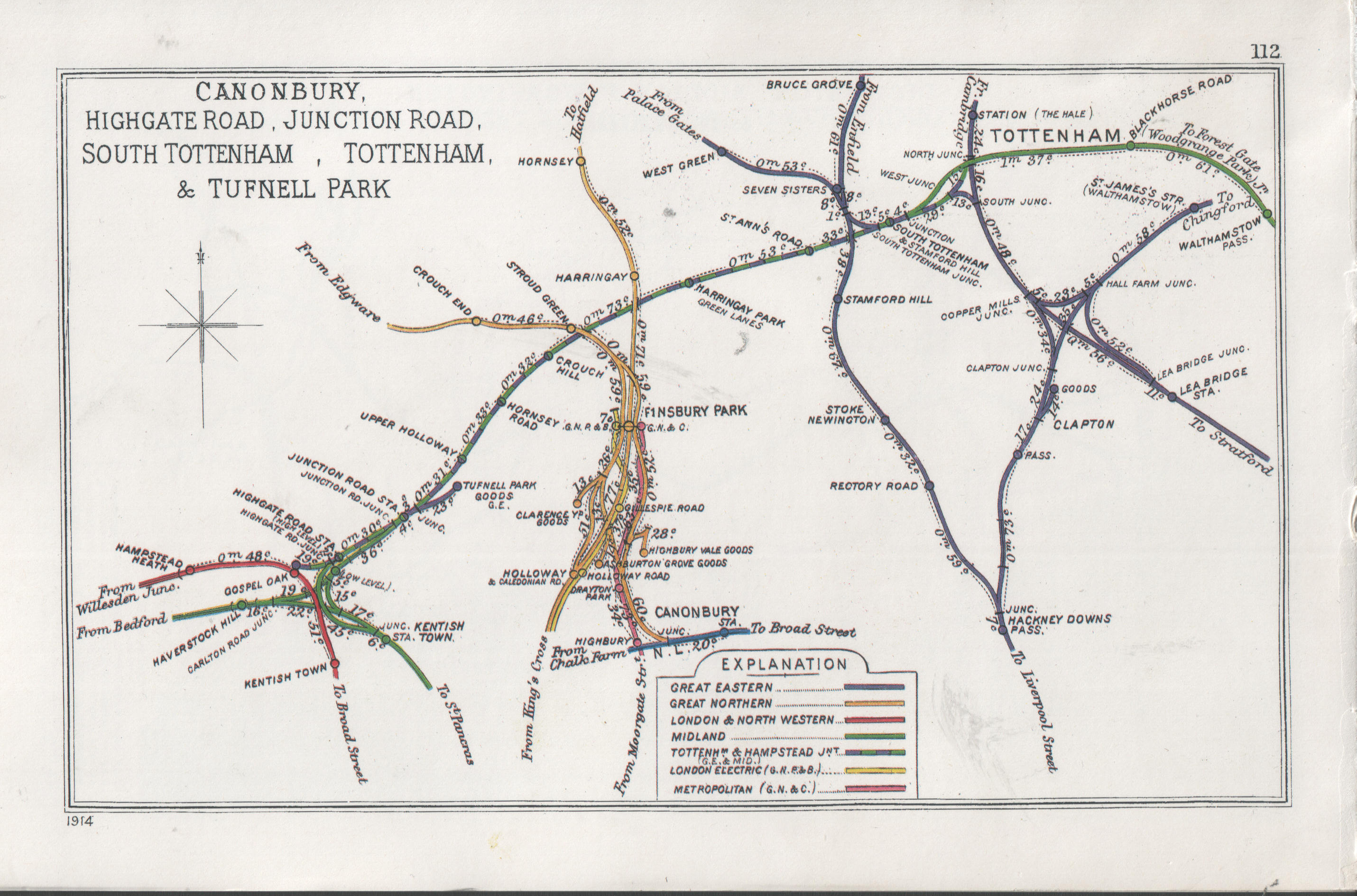
Map dated 1914, showing, on the right, some of the north London branches of the Great Eastern Railway

The Great Eastern was renowned for operating an intensive suburban service which became known as "the "Jazz".

Serving the East End of London, the London Docklands and the capital's eastern suburbs, the Great Eastern's suburban services had a much greater proportion of working class industrial workers, labourers and lower-ranking office workers than the suburban networks of the likes of the London and South Western Railway or the Metropolitan. The GER had to transport greater numbers of passengers commuting in and out of the urban centre and at lower fares. The GER encouraged passenger numbers with low-price 'workman fares' services which ran in the early morning and late evening. These used older rolling stock with high-density seating (often using wooden benches for ease of cleaning after being used by passengers from docks, factories and markets in dirty work clothes). There were also 'half fare trains' using more modern and comfortable suburban coaching stock aimed at lower-income white-collar workers such as clerks and junior office workers. There was a symbiotic relationship between the railway and property development - the existence of the railway made it possible for even industrial workers to move into new housing developments in the suburbs which then provided extra custom for the GER. The GER itself invested in property development near its routes and in some cases even built its own housing on land purchased as part of railway construction. Although most closely associated with these crowded, low-cost commuter train serving the suburbs of eastern London, the GER also provided luxurious first class compartments in many of its commuter trains for businessmen and wealthier customers travelling to and from the City with its numerous banks and other financial offices.

By 1900 over 90 per cent of passengers using Liverpool Street station were making journeys of 12 miles (19 km) or less and around 75,000 people arrived at the station before 10.30am each morning. A total of 400 suburban and 36 main line trains were timetabled to use the terminus each day. Passenger numbers continued to rise in the early 20th century and a survey in 1913 showed that some of the GER's suburban trains were carrying up to 1400 people each and the station itself was beginning to suffer from overcrowding at peak times that was not only preventing the easy movement of people in and out and delaying the departure of trains but presenting a danger to the public.

After World War I (during which a decline in passenger numbers provided something of a reprieve) the GER began to consider ways of alleviating the problem. The Liverpool Street site and its approaches were already full utilised, with no room for additional or extended platforms, more tracks or an enlarged station concours. Consideration was given to electrification, following the model of the London, Brighton and South Coast Railway which had electrified its inner suburban routes between 1909 and 1912 and so been able to run both more and faster services on existing infrastructure. However the high capital costs required of electrifying the GER's much more extensive and wider-reaching suburban network - estimated at £3 million (£140 million in 2021) - were beyond the perennially cash-strapped GER's resources. Before the war the GER had recruited the American executive Henry Worth Thornton - former superintendent of the Long Island Rail Road (in many ways an American counterpart to the GER, operating an intensive commuter service in and out of New York City) - as its general manager. Working with operations superintendent F. V. Russell (former chief designer at Stratford Works), Thornton developed a way of comprehensively overhauling and optimising the Great Eastern's suburban service to increase capacity on the existing infrastructure with minimal investment.

At Liverpool street tracks were rearranged and new junctions between running lines added to improve capacity and flexibility. Small refuge tracks were added at the platform ends to stable locomotives between duties without blocking running lines, signalling was expanded to allow more than one train to occupy a platform road at a time and on the station concourse the passenger barriers were moved back to both direct outward-going passengers more effectively to their trains and to encourage outward-going passengers to leave the station without getting in the way of other streams of people leaving or joining other trains.

Improvements to the rolling stock were made on services running to Chingford. Enfield and Wood Green (Palace Gates). Trains were reformed into sets of 16 four-wheel coaches with each train having seating capacity for 848 people, with additional standing room in peak hours. These were non-corridor compartment-type coaches, but in for third class the compartment dividing walls were cut down to the level of the tops of the seats, allowing more nimble passengers to climb over the seat backs between seating bays to find empty seats. This meant that passengers no longer had to find a compartment with vacant seats before boarding which reduced the dwell time – Thornton and Russell aimed to get the time spent at intermediate stops down from minutes to seconds. To help with this the coaches had their doors painted in different colours to identify the class of each compartment - first class were painted yellow and second class for blue, with the third class accommodation which made up the majority of all the GER's trains being unmarked. Similarly, a system of coloured boards representing the destination and/or route of each train was introduced, with the boards being fitted to the rear and sides of the guard's van which would be nearest the concourse at Liverpool Street and enable passengers to quickly find and board their train.

The GER had already adopted the Westinghouse air brake due to its greater effectiveness and quicker response when making frequent stops in suburban services. Thornton and Russell instructed drivers to adopt a new technique of running into stations at speed, fully applying the brake as the engine reached the start of the platform, then fully releasing the brake as it approached the end, which would bring the train to a rapid but smooth stop with the engine right at the end of the platform. This would shave further crucial seconds of the time required for each intermediate stop when compared to the more usual technique of cutting speed on the approach to stations, making an initial part-application of the brake and easing the train to a stop. However, with the new method there was very little room for error and drivers had to learn exactly when to apply the brake (and by exactly what amount) and when to release it in order to bring the train to a stop without under- or over-shooting the stopping point and without jolting the train and its passengers.

The new services were introduced in July 1920. When fully combined these improvements and alterations allowed 24 suburban trains to use Liverpool Street each hour - over 40,000 passengers when inward and outward flows were combined. This was a world record for a steam-hauled railway system. On arrival, the engine that had brought the train in would immediately be uncoupled, while another engine was attached at the other end - in many cases this engine would have followed the train into the platform through the station approaches, having been let out of a holding siding to run close behind by the new signalling arrangements. The detached engine would be topped up with water from a newly installed water column at the concourse end of each platform road. As the train departed, the now-available engine would follow it down the platform before being sent either to one of the refuge bays in the platform ends or to a siding at the approaches to follow another arriving service into another platform in its turn. In most cases engines were not kept at Liverpool Street for more than ten minutes between duties. Each individual train was arranged to spend as little as four minutes at the terminus between arrival and departure. This intensity of service is all the more remarkable when it is considered that the vast majority of the suburban services were concentrated in only four of Liverpool Street's 18 platforms, with the remainder being used for outer suburban and mainline services.

In total, Thornton and Russell's new optimised service provided an increase in capacity of between 50 and 75 per cent without any major changes to infrastructure, no new rolling stock and a total cost of only £80,000 (£3.6 million in 2020 - only a fortieth of the projected cost of electrification). The new suburban services were popular with passengers and the press (which had frequently criticised the GER in the pre-WW1 years for overcrowding and slow journey times, even to the extent of running long-term campaigns against the company). The clashing bright colours of the painted doors and the identification boards were seen as a distinctive feature of the new services from the start and early GER publicity referred to 'The Rainbow Service'. However the appearance was thought of as 'jazzy' in the slang of the period and a local newspaper called the service The Jazz, which quickly became widely used.

The service was initially operated by the GER's existing stud of 2-4-2T engines such as the M15 and G69 while carriages were adapted versions of either existing four-wheelers or new-builds to these older designs. The GER had always intended to introduce more powerful engines and more modern and higher-capacity carriages to The Jazz to maximise the improvements. New 0-6-2 L77 Class tank engines were introduced from 1921, along with new eight-wheel 57 ft-long (17.3 metres) compartment coaches (with the added refinement of steam heating for winter use), which had their class identification colours painted in a strip between the windows and the roof rather than on the doors. By 1924 over 280,000 people were using The Jazz every day and Liverpool Street was regularly handling over 40,000 passengers per hour in peak periods. When the GER was grouped into the London and North Eastern Railway in 1923 the LNER began introducing articulated car sets of even higher capacity to a design developed by the Great Northern Railway.

The true Jazz services only lasted until 1926 when the service frequency and intensity was cut down due to the General Strike and rising competition from trams, trolley buses, motorbuses and private cars meant that the service on the former GER suburban lines was never brought back up to its planned level. Nonetheless, the services remained widely known as The Jazz and even in the 1940s was still running 18 trains per hour and between 160,000 and 180,000 passengers used Liverpool Street each day. Plans to electrify the former GER system had been developed in the 1930s and were put into action under British Railways. Liverpool Street received its first electric lines in 1946 and electric suburban services – finally replacing The Jazz - began in 1960.

The GER also operated suburban services out of Fenchurch Street station with trains to North Woolwich, Blackwall (until 1925) Gallions and Loughton sharing the station with the London Tilbury and Southend until 1912 when the Midland railway took over operation of that railway.

=== Named trains ===
The Cathedrals Express operated from Liverpool Street via Cambridge, Ely, Lincoln and Doncaster to York. Three services were run each day although it was never a particularly well patronised service.

The North Country Continental operated between Harwich and Manchester Piccadilly usually being routed via March and the GNGEJR route. This train included the first restaurant car on the Great Eastern (in 1891) and this was also the first service in the UK to allow third-class passengers to dine. A new train set was built for this service in 1906 and generally operated in the following formation:

ENGINE+THIRD CLASS BRAKE+CORRIDOR THIRD+OPEN THIRD+KITCHEN AND OPEN FIRST+SEMI-OPEN FIRST+SIX WHEEL BRAKE (this constituted the York section). Then followed various corridor composite brakes followed each detached from the rear of the northbound train en route. These were for LIVERPOOL (detached Doncaster on the outward journey)+ LIVERPOOL + MANCHESTER(detached at Lincoln and routed via the Great Central routes) + BIRMINGHAM (via Midland Railway routes) + BIRMINGHAM (via London and North Western routes)(both of which were detached at March).

The Norfolk Coast Express operated between Cromer and Liverpool Street and a purpose-built train was built for this service in 1907. This was the first formation without six-wheeler carriages in the 12-car formation, which included eight carriages for Cromer, two for Sheringham and two for Mundesley. The portions were detached at North Walsham.

However whether all (or indeed any) of these trains carried nameboards in Great Eastern days is doubtful.

=== Branch line services ===
Typically branch line services were worked by small tank engines usually with ancient carriages handed down from main line or suburban services. Generally many branch services would be timed to connect to services to the main line thus providing through journeys. Many rural branch lines had no more than a handful of services each day.

For instance in the July 1922 Bradshaws Timetable Guide, Table 316 showed five departures from Framlingham at 07:20, 08:30, 12:40, 16:25 and 18:30. All services had connections to London Liverpool Street. All trains called at the two stations on the branch, taking 18 minutes to get to the junction station at Wickham Market.

From Wickham Market the trains departed at 07:56, 09:35, 13:14, 17:52 and 19:10. All services except the 09:35 departure had a connection from London Liverpool Street.

In 1865, when the Saffron Walden Railway opened, the GER provided some of its most modern rolling stock on opening day before reverting to stock of more dubious quality for general operation of the line.

=== Other services ===
The GER ran a number of trains from Ely and Cambridge to St Pancras after the Midland Railway completed the Tottenham and Hampstead Junction Railway in 1880. in 1914 there were three express services from St Pancras to Cambridge (12:22 pm 2:40 pm and 5:05 pm) with the 12:22 pm reaching Cambridge in a creditable 71 minutes. Suspended during the First World War, these were briefly revived but stopped running in 1922.

Royal trains were also worked from St Pancras to Sandringham in Norfolk, and race day trains to Newmarket also operated into St Pancras.

The GER also operated services from Liverpool Street via the East London Line to New Cross and New Cross Gate with some services being extended to East Croydon.

=== Freight traffic ===
As the GER served a predominantly rural area, the majority of outward traffic was agricultural in nature. The opening of the Great Northern and Great Eastern Joint railway in 1882 gave the GER access to the coal fields in South Yorkshire and East Nottinghamshire and this became an important source of traffic for the railway.

There were a number of ports on the GER including King's Lynn, Great Yarmouth, Lowestoft, Felixstowe and Parkeston Quay. Fish traffic emanated from Lowestoft and Great Yarmouth.

One of the more obscure services the GER offered was the delivery of sea water. This service started in the 1870s and by 1880 it was reported that 4,500 imperial gallons (20,000 L; 5,400 US gal) had been delivered on a single day. A redundant steam locomotive was employed in the task at Lowestoft and a number of fish and open carriage wagons were converted to saltwater tanks. The trains ran to London where the water was distilled into three-imperial-gallon (14 L; 3.6 US gal) barrels and sold for sixpence (pre decimalisation price c. 1880, about £6.00 in 2025). The sea water was used in baths and was still running as late as 1910 although the exact final date of operation is unknown.

== Accidents and incidents ==
- On 3 August 1863, a passenger train ran into a bullock near North Wootton station. Five passengers were killed as a result with the poor state of the rolling stock being partially to blame.
- On 26 September 1865, a light engine returning from Great Yarmouth to Ipswich derailed between Darsham and Halesworth killing the driver and fireman.
- On 3 September 1881, there was a collision at Bow Road where a train ran into the back of a stationary train which had failed at the station. The driver and fireman of the moving train were killed and 11 passengers injured. In the inquiry that followed the cause was deemed to be the failure of the signalman to protect the rear of the train by placing signals to danger. The train crew however were criticised in that while they had noticed the signals were not at danger, they had failed to inform the signalman. The guard of the failed train was criticised for not having properly protected the rear of that train.
- On 6 August 1889, there was an accident between Bishopsgate and Liverpool Street when an up passenger service ran into the back of a stationary empty coaching stock train. The enquiry was unable to determine the exact cause of the accident due to conflicting witness statements.
- On 17 October 1891, a passenger train was derailed at Lavenham, Suffolk. During recovery operations, a crane was derailed.

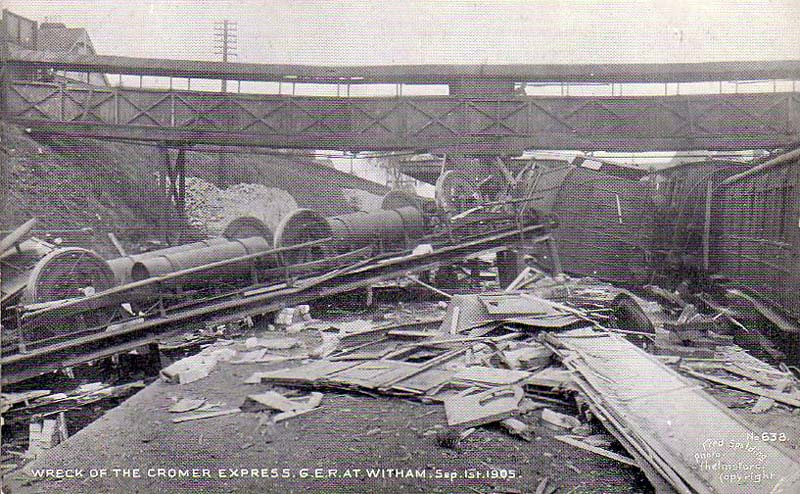
Witham.

- On 24 December 1891, an accident occurred at Barnby Box (between Beccles and Carlton Colville) with three killed and four injuries.
- On 25 September 1900 at Westerfield 0845, GER Class Y14 0-6-0 locomotive No. 522 which was then just a year old stopped at a signal on the Ipswich side of the level crossing awaiting a route to the Felixstowe branch. Shortly afterwards the boiler exploded killing driver John Barnard and his fireman William Macdonald, both based at Ipswich engine shed. The boiler was thrown 40 yards (37 m) forwards, over the level crossing and ended up on the down platform. Apparently the locomotive had a history of boiler problems although in the official report the Boiler Foreman at Ipswich Engine shed was blamed. The victims were buried in Ipswich cemetery and both their gravestones have a likeness of a Y14 0-6-0 carved onto them.
- On 5 April 1905, two trains collided on the junction directly north of Stratford Market station with the goods engine overturning and crushing its fireman William Secker. The driver of the other train had mistakenly started his train thinking the signal was in his favour.
- On 1 September 1905, an express passenger train was derailed at Witham, Essex due to a platelayer's error. Eleven people were killed and 71 were injured.
- On 9 January 1913, William Harwood, whilst on shift at Lowestoft station, was struck by an overhanging footstep and fell onto the track. Harwood was run over by a passing carriage, resulting in him losing his left leg and breaking his right.
- On 12 July 1913, an express passenger train collided with a light engine at Colchester, Essex due to a signalman's error. Three people were killed and fourteen were injured.
- On 1 January 1915, an express passenger train overran signals and collided with a local passenger train at Ilford, Essex. Ten people were killed and over 500 were injured.

== Rolling stock and other material ==
=== Locomotives ===
==== Prior to 1862 ====
Prior to 1862 the companies that had built the various parts of the network operated locomotives from a variety of engineering companies. Generally the wheel arrangements were 2-2-0 and 2-2-2 for most classes of locomotives. It was not until 1850 that the Eastern Counties Railway under Gooch built a locomotive at the then newly opened Stratford Works. Number 20 was the first of a class of six 2-2-2T locomotives (although three more were also built by R B Longridge and Co of Bedlington, Northumberland). Slightly bigger improved versions of the class followed in 1853 and 1854.

In 1859 Sinclair (Chief mechanical engineer (CME) of the Eastern Counties Railway and later first CME of the Great Eastern) started some form of standardisation with the Y Class 2-4-0 locomotives, of which 110 were built by various engineering firms (including one French firm). The last locomotives of this class were withdrawn in 1894.

==== 1862 to 1880 ====
Sinclair's first design for the GER was the W class single drivers built between 1862 and 1867 by a number of engineering firms. Two of these locomotives were rebuilt from the 2-2-2 to a 4-2-2 configuration later in their lives and these two, plus one of the original locomotives, carried a canary yellow livery. Another member of this class carried a cream livery "encircled by garlands of roses" when it was used to haul a special train in 1863 for the Prince and Princess of Wales (Edward VII and Queen Alexandria) after their marriage at Westminster Abbey. These locomotives were responsible for running express services on the Great Eastern and in later life worked the Cathedrals Express to Lincoln and York.

Scrapping began in 1883 with the last two locomotives being withdrawn in 1894. The only other classes of locomotive that Sinclair designed were a 2-4-0T class of five engines built for the North Woolwich line and a class of 2-4-2T engines known as Scotchmen because they were built by Neilson, Reid & Co of Glasgow. Both classes entered service in 1864/65.

Generally Great Eastern locomotives carried a pea-green livery with black lining at this time.

When Johnson took over as CME, the GER was so short of locomotives that he persuaded the North British Railway to let the GER have five locomotives of a 2-4-0 class being built by the Neilson, Reid & Co for them on loan. These formed the basis of the 40 strong 'little Sharpie' (or Number 1) class, with 10 being built by Stratford Works and the other 30 by Sharp Stewart hence the nickname. The GER was working many trains on the London Tilbury and Southend Railway at this time and the Sharpies were deployed on this traffic. The last two were withdrawn in 1913.

The next Johnson class was an 0-6-0 goods engine (Class 417) introduced in 1867 and 1868 and numbering 60 engines. A number of these engines had hinged chimneys for use through Silvertown tunnel on the North Woolwich line which had limited headroom. Scrapping began in 1888 with the final locomotive withdrawn in 1899.

Another more powerful 0-6-0 design followed in 1872/3 and was known as the 477 class. Introduced in 1872 and 1873, this 50-strong class was built by 5 different companies, and was notable for being the first GER engines with a six-wheeled tender. All were withdrawn between 1898 and 1902.

The growth of London suburban traffic saw a requirement for additional tank engines. The GER borrowed some Metropolitan Railway A Class 4-4-0T engines in the early 1870s and had 15 T7 class 0-4-2T engines built, followed by some 0-4-4T engines, one of which was the first locomotive to carry the distinctive GER Royal Blue livery.

The final locomotives introduced by Johnson were two C8 class 4-4-0 locomotives which were built with no engine brakes and no dedicated tenders. These locomotives, numbers 305 and 306, were frequently used on royal trains and finished their careers as station pilots at St Pancras and Liverpool Street.

The 0-4-4T 61 class was the first Adams engine, and these 50 engines were built for suburban traffic. Ten 0-4-2T locomotives (Class 61) followed between 1877 and 1879 and these lasted until 1907. Adams next design was a 4-4-0 class known as Ironclads. Unfortunately these were not very successful on passenger traffic and were soon deployed on freight workings.

The next Adams locomotive was the first UK 2-6-0 locomotive built in 1877. Another failure, this class of 15 locomotives were withdrawn after a working life of eight years, mostly working coal traffic between Peterborough and London.

Adams was succeeded by Massey Bromley who made the decision that henceforth more locomotives would be built at Stratford Works. Up to this point only 80 had been built.

However Bromley's first class of 4-2-2 locomotives were built by Dubs and Kitson with 12 allocated to Stratford and four each to Norwich and Yarmouth sheds. One of these locomotives was later equipped with oil-burning capabilities, but the increasing demands of railway traffic saw these engines withdrawn by 1893 after a relatively short life. Bromley also designed an 0-6-0 class which lasted some 24 years in traffic. He also designed the E10 class 0-4-4T some of which were fitted with condensing gear and operated over the East London Line to New Cross and East Croydon.

==== 1880 to 1922 ====
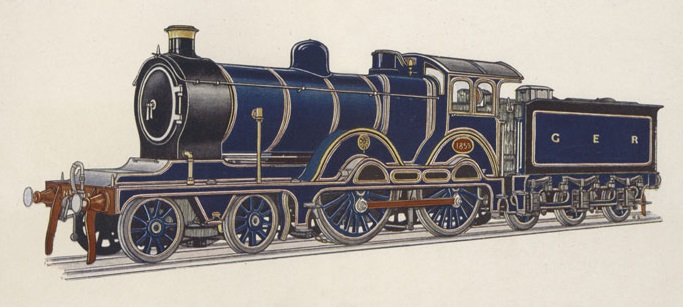
GER Class D56 in original Great Eastern blue livery with decorative features as depicted in a 1910 colour plate by W.J. Stokoe.

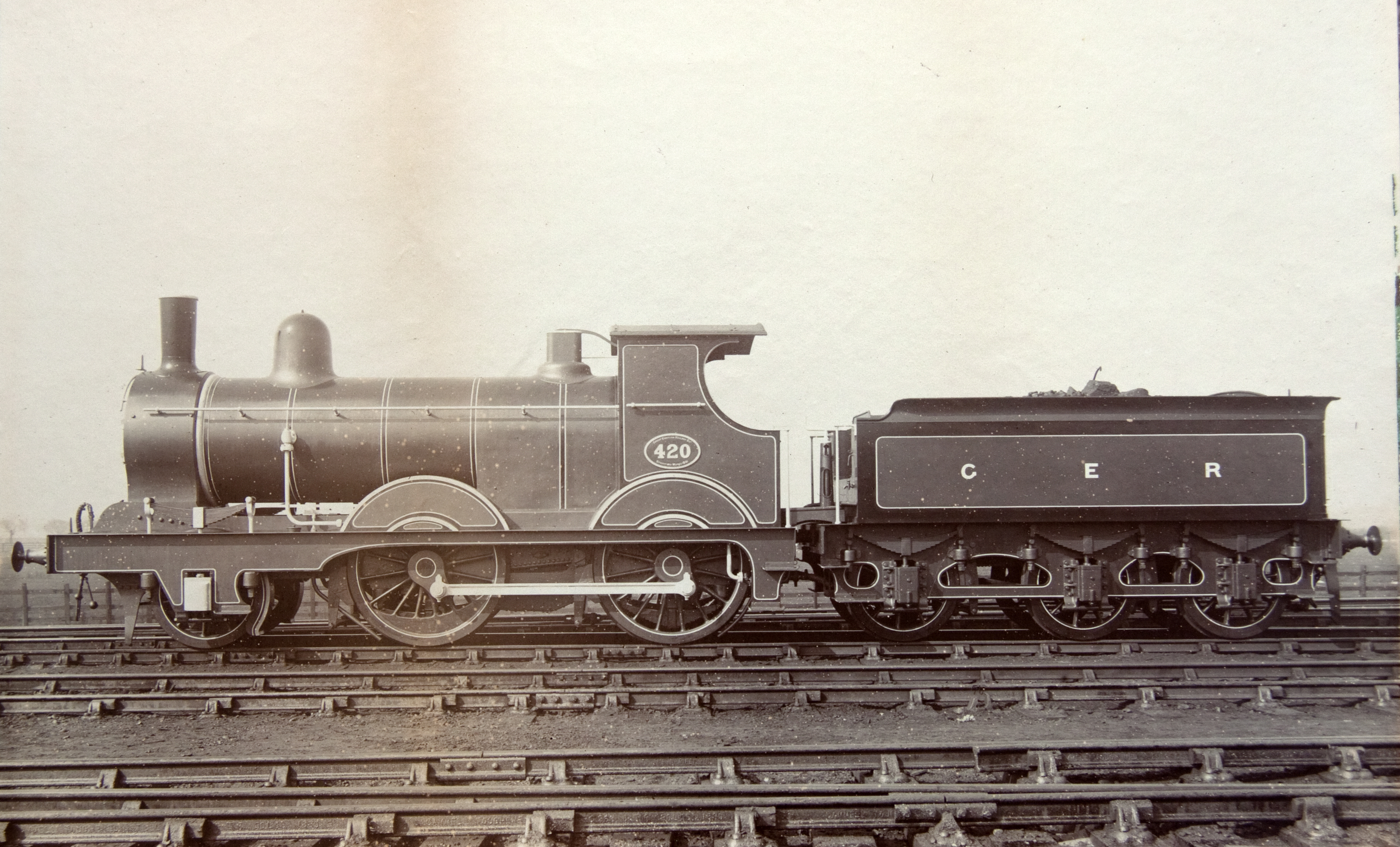
GER Class T26 no 420 2-4-0 (later LNER Class E4)

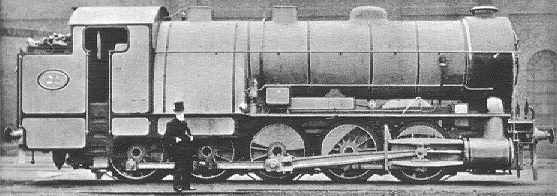
An official GER picture from 1902 showing CME James Holden alongside the unique 0-10-0T engine Decapod

Between 1880 and 1922 the Great Eastern produced some distinctive locomotives, and several of these have been preserved. Almost all of the Great Eastern's locomotives were, after 1880, built at Stratford Works and many lasted until the end of steam on the Great Eastern.

Express services on the GER were latterly in the hands of the Class S69 (LNER class B12) 4-6-0 locomotives. Designed by James Holden and also known as the '1500 class', these engines were built at Stratford Works (51 engines) and William Beardmore (20 engines). Ten engines were later built for the London and North Eastern Railway by Beyer Peacock, and it is one of these locomotives that is preserved today.

These locomotives were built to succeed the three classes of 4-4-0 employed by the GER on express services which were becoming heavier as the railways prospered. Classes S46, D56 and H88 (LNER D14, D15, and D16) were collectively nicknamed "Claud Hamiltons" because the first S46 (built at Stratford in 1900, numbered 1900) was named after the then-current chairman of the GER, Lord Claud Hamilton. Most of the "Clauds" were later rebuilt by the LNER; the final one was withdrawn in 1960 and scrapped.

Local suburban traffic was dealt with by numerous 2-4-2T and 0-6-0T locomotives belonging to several different classes. Stratford Engine Shed, for instance, had 163 2-4-2T engines of four classes. As trains got heavier, these locomotives were replaced by the Class L77 0-6-2T (LNER N7) designed by Alfred John Hill and introduced in 1915. 134 were built, including a number after the LNER took over in 1923; one is preserved. The 2-4-2Ts, of which none survive, were mostly cascaded out of suburban traffic by the 1940s and worked until the late 1950s on branch lines.

Mention should also be made of the T26 (LNER E4) 2-4-0s, which remained in service as the last locomotives of this wheel arrangement in Great Britain. Derived from the larger T19 2-4-0, 100 of these locomotives were built between 1891 and 1902 and worked a variety of trains across East Anglia. The last one, GER no. 490, was preserved as part of the National Collection when withdrawn in 1959. Today it resides at Bressingham Steam Museum, Norfolk. Some of the T19s, incidentally, were rebuilt as 4-4-0s (class T19R) between 1905 and 1908, having been taken off express work by the "Claud Hamiltons". As LNER class D13, the last worked until 1944.

GER goods designs of this period were invariably 0-6-0 tender engines. The main freight class built by the GER was Worsdell's Y14 (LNER J15) 0-6-0 class. 289 examples were produced between 1883 and 1913 with most being built at Stratford Works, although a small number were built by Sharp Stewart. On 10–11 December 1891, the Great Eastern Railway's Stratford Works built one of these locomotives and had it in steam with a coat of grey primer in just 9 hours 47 minutes; this remains a world record. The locomotive then went off to run 36,000 miles (58,000 km) on Peterborough to London coal trains before coming back to the works for the final coat of paint. It lasted 40 years and ran a total of 1,127,750 miles (205,594 km). As freight traffic grew heavier after 1900, more 0-6-0 freight locomotives were built including classes F48 (LNER J16), E72 (LNER J18), G58 (LNER J17) and D81 (LNER J20); the Y14s, meanwhile, went into general local and branch line service, on both passenger and freight trains. The last Y14s ran until 1962, and no. 564 is preserved on the North Norfolk Railway; and G58 no. 1217 (withdrawn 1962) is in the National Railway Museum, York.

Shunting was generally in the hands of 0-6-0T locomotives although of note were the Class J70 tram engines employed at Ipswich docks and on the Wisbech and Upwell Tramway. This class of locomotive was later the inspiration of the Reverend Awdry's Toby the tram engine.

Finally mention must be made of the Decapod which was the first 0-10-0T built in Britain, and possibly the only locomotive built for purely political purposes in order to block the passage through Parliament of a new rival scheme for an electric railway.

==== Livery ====
In the early years, the Great Eastern locomotive livery changed often, first being held in various shades of green and later black. In 1882 the well-known Ultramarine Blue livery was introduced. It consisted of Ultramarine Blue over an undercoat of French Grey, with black smokebox and vermillion buffer beams and lining. From 1915 locos were not given a top coat and ran in French Grey undercoat but with the boiler bands picked out in black.

==== Locomotive stock (1923) ====
Numbers of each GER locomotive class and running numbers (first and last numbers only) in 1922, prior to the 1923 Grouping. Note that the numbering is not necessarily contiguous:

Class	LNER Class	Wheel Arrangement	Total	Traffic type	Running Numbers
S69	B12	4-6-0	70	Express Passenger	1500–1570
T19	D13	4-4-0	58	Passenger	700–779 1012–1039
S46	D14	4-4-0	21	Passenger	1862–1900
D56	D15	4-4-0	90	Passenger	1790–1899 Note D14/15 numbered in same series
T26	E4	2-4-0	100	Passenger	407–506
C32	F3	2-4-2T	50	Branch Passenger	1040–1099
M15	F4	2-4-2T	118	Suburban Passenger	71–189 211–244 572–591 650–679 791–800
M15	F5	2-4-2T	30	Suburban Passenger	91–96 100–110 141–147 170 179 188 589/90 780–788
G69	F6	2-4-2T	22	Suburban Passenger	1-10 61–70 789 790 Note F4/F5/F6 numbered in same series.
Y65	F7	2-4-2T	12	Passenger	1300–1311
S44	G4	0-4-4T	40	Suburban Passenger	1100–1139
N31	J14	0-6-0	18	Freight	604 951–998
Y14	J15	0-6-0	272	Freight	37–39 119–124 507–699 801–945
F48	J16	0-6-0	46	Freight	1150–1209
G58	J17	0-6-0	44	Freight	1153–1198 numbered in same series as J16. 1201–1239
E72	J18	0-6-0	10	Freight	1240–1249
T77	J19	0-6-0	25	Freight	1140–1149 1250–1269
D81	J20	0-6-0	25	Freight	1270–1294
E22	J65	0-6-0T	20	Shunting/Local Freight	150–159 245–254
T18	J66	0-6-0T	50	Shunting/Local Freight	275–326
R24	J67	0-6-0T	51	Shunting/Local Freight/Suburban Passenger	11–20 161 164 169 199–264 327–336 397–406
C72	J68	0-6-0T	20	Shunting/Local Freight/Suburban Passenger	21–30 41–50
R24 / S56	J69	0-6-0T	109	Shunting/Local Freight/Suburban Passenger	51–60 81–90 160–168 190–198 265–274 305 328 335 337–396
C53	J70	0-6-0T	12	Tram type shunting locos	125–139
	J92	0-6-0T	3	Crane Tank engines	B C and D were Stratford works shunters.
L77	N7	0-6-2T	12	Suburban Passenger	1000–1011
B74	Y4	0-4-0T	5	Dock/Works shunters	210 226–229
209	Y5	0-4-0T	4	Dock/Works shunters	209 0228 230 231
G15	Y6	0-4-0T	6	Dock/Works shunters	0125 0126 0129 132–134 - all allocated to Wisbech and Outwell tramway

==== Preserved locomotives ====
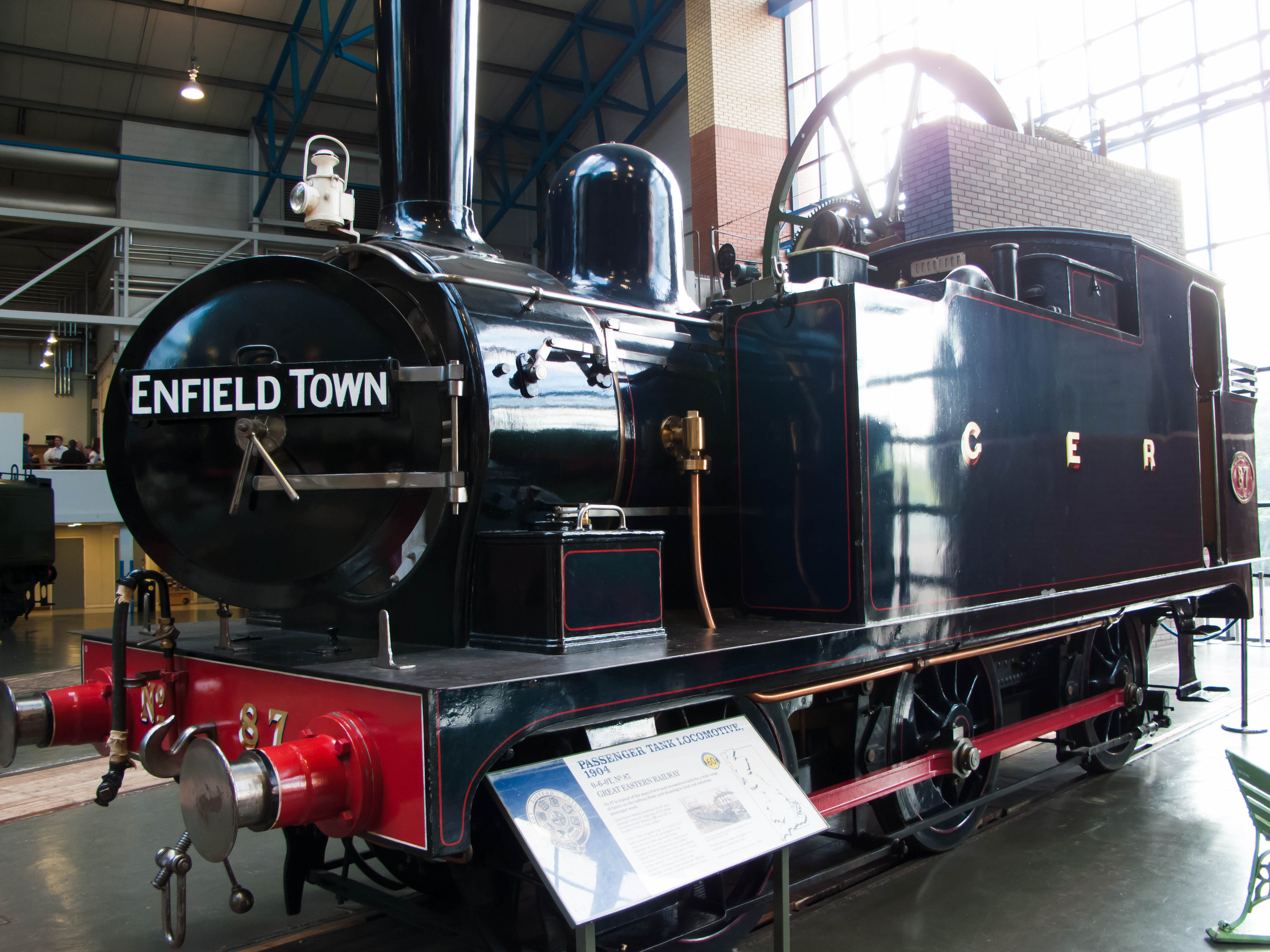
J69 0-6-0T engine in GER livery and carrying headboard

The following GE locomotives are preserved:

Number	GE class	LNER class	Wheel arrangement	Location
BR 61572	S69	B12	4-6-0	North Norfolk Railway
GER 490	T26	E4	2-4-0	Bressingham Steam and Gardens
GER 564	Y14	J15	0-6-0	North Norfolk Railway
LNE 8217	G58	J17	0-6-0	Barrow Hill Roundhouse
GER 87	S56	J67	0-6-0T	Bressingham Steam and Gardens
BR 69621	L77	N7	0-6-2T	East Anglian Railway Museum
GER 225	209	Y5	0-4-0T	The Flour Mill, Lydney

As of 2025 there are plans to build a replica steam locomotive - a class M15 2-4-2T.

=== Coaching stock ===
Whilst not being at the forefront of carriage development, there were a number of interesting developments on the GER worth noting.

==== Main line ====
Even by 1900 bogie coaches were rare on GER, with trains of six-wheelers being the norm. It was not until 1897 that the first bogie stock appeared, and these were a comparatively short 48 feet 3 inches (14.71 m) long. They contained two first-class compartments with lavatories sandwiched between four third-class compartments and a luggage compartment. The GER supplied separate luggage compartments for most of its main line stock. In 1900 an updated version had a corridor and third-class access to the lavatories but no corridor connections to other carriages.

In 1904 Stratford produced a complete corridor train (this means a person can walk from the first to the last carriage whilst the train is moving). Despite the trend to bogied stock, Stratford still included three 6-wheeler carriages and a 4-wheeled luggage van in this formation. The other vehicles were all bogied stock and included a kitchen car. This train was also fitted for steam heating throughout and was employed on Liverpool Street - Parkeston Quay services.

In 1906 a new train set was produced for the North Country Continental train (see below) and in 1907 for the Norfolk Coast Express (see below). The latter was notable for being the first all corridor set built by Stratford Works. However, with the restaurant sets built in 1900 being corridor coaches, more corridor coaches were being added to main line sets.

The livery of the stock was teak (effectively varnished wood) but in 1919 the decision was taken to paint all stock dark red. At the grouping in 1923 however all stock reverted to the teak livery.

==== Pullman ====
The introduction of Pullman cars to the GER was the idea of American General Manager Henry Worth Thornton. These were tried across the network and required payment of a supplementary fare. Unfortunately it was not a success although they were used on Liverpool Street - Harwich Continental trains for many years.

==== Dining and restaurant ====
In 1891 the Great Eastern introduced the first restaurant car to its North Country Continental service.

In 1899 Stratford Works produced four restaurant car sets consisting of three cars vestibuled together but without any corridor connections. This meant passengers had to spend the whole journey in the restaurant car. These were employed on services from Cromer and Yarmouth to Liverpool Street.

==== Suburban ====
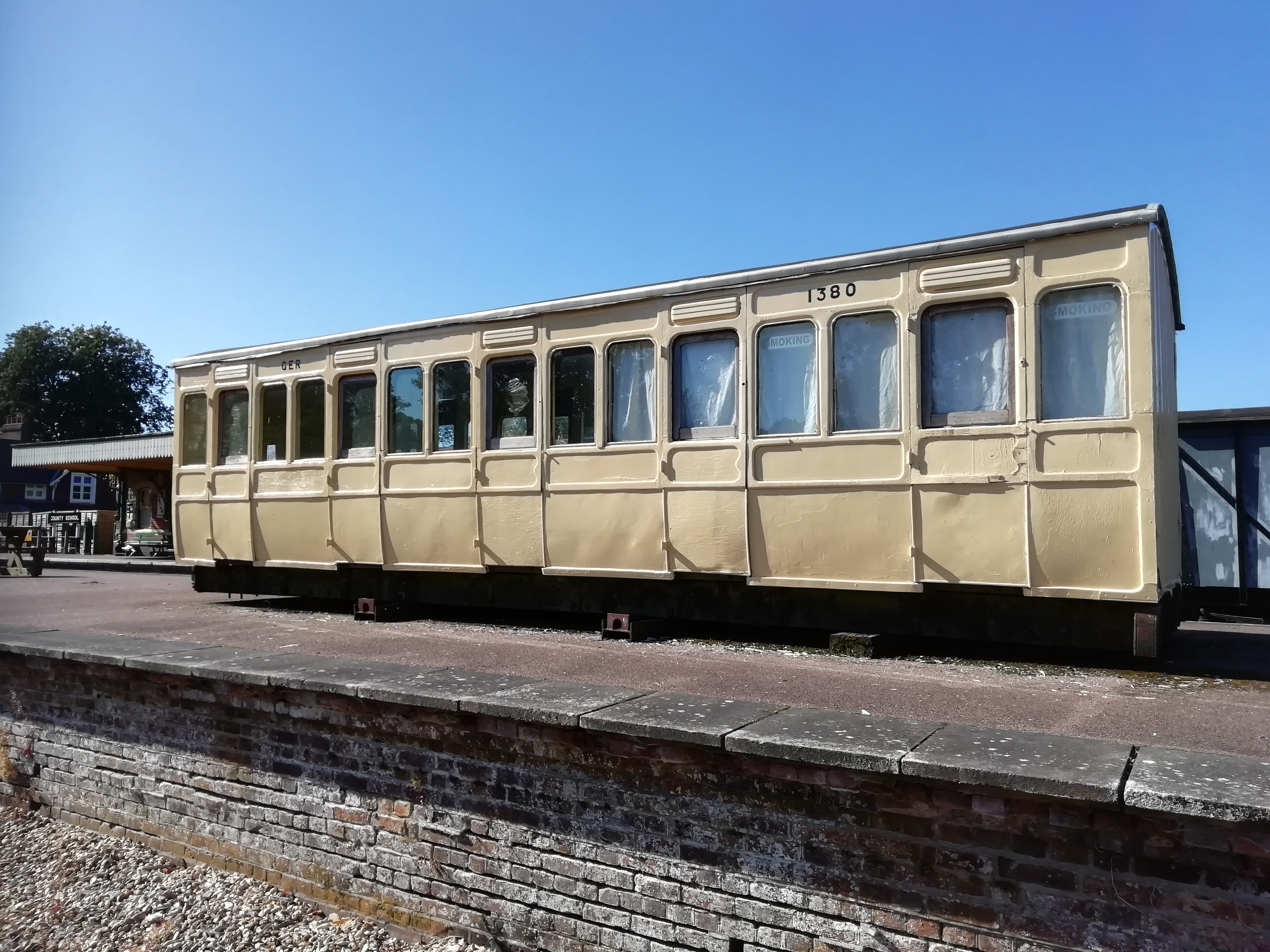
Body of GER 1380 4 Wheel Carriage, built 1892 at Stratford works for London suburban traffic (2019)

In 1900 the majority of GER suburban trains were composed of four-wheeler carriages.

Interior design was spartan and around 1900 third-class passengers sat on bare boards five abreast, second-class passengers on cushions also five abreast, while first-class passengers sat four abreast and enjoyed more legroom. In 1899 James Holden produced the first six passengers sat abreast carriages in a 13-carriage, third-class only train (each carriage was 27 feet (8.2 m) long and 9 feet (2.7 m) wide and had five compartments). This set, which also included such modern features as slam lock doors and gas tail lamps became the model for future suburban carriage design.

In 1899 Holden built the first GER all-bogied suburban train and although a success, the next one did not follow until 1911.

The GER made every effort to maximise the capacity of its suburban carriages to deal with the rise in usage. In the early 1900s some four-wheeler carriages were cut in half longitudinally and a section inserted to make them wider in order to increase the capacity. More bogied suburban trains followed in 1911 and were deployed on the Ilford, Gidea Park and Loughton services. By 1915 A. J. Hill instigated a policy of converting old four-wheel carriages into bogied stock and some 500 four-wheeled carriages were converted this way. The GER had a reputation for doing things on the cheap and this certainly was cheaper than building new stock.

=== Ships ===
The GER also operated a number of ferries.

Ship	Launched	Tonnage (GRT)	Notes
PS Adelaide	1880	969	Built by Barrow Shipbuilding Company. The company's first steel ship and last paddle steamer on Harwich – Rotterdam route. Named after Adelaide Simpson the wife of GER director Lightly Simpson and launched by her. Sold for scrapping in 1896
SS Amsterdam	1894	1,745	Built by Earle's Shipbuilding of Hull for Harwich – Hook of Holland route, and later transferred to Antwerp service in 1910 when replaced by modern tonnage. Scrapped in 1928
RMS Antwerp	1919	2,957	Built by John Brown and Company of Clydebank for Harwich – Antwerp service. She served as a Q-ship in the First World War. Scrapped in 1951
SS Archangel	1910	2,570	Built by John Brown and Company of Clydebank for Harwich – Hook of Holland service. Bombed and sunk off east coast of Scotland in May 1941
PS Avalon	1864	670	Built by J & W Dudgeon at Cubitt Town on the River Thames for service Harwich – Rotterdam. Sold in 1888 to Earle's Shipbuilding, Hull and wrecked off Jamaica in 1909.
SS Berlin	1894	1,745	Built for Harwich – Hook of Holland service by Earle's Shipbuilding of Hull. Sister of SS Amsterdam. Sank whilst entering Hook of Holland in February 1907 with loss of 112 lives.
SS Brandon	1871	718	Built as the "Richard Young" by J & W Dudgeon at Cubitt Town on the River Thames for the Harwich – Rotterdam service. Converted to a single screw by Earle's Shipbuilding in 1890 and renamed "Brandon", after which she was used for secondary and relief services. Scrapped in 1905.
MV Brightlingsea	1925	51	Built by Rowhedge Ironworks. Launch used between Harwich, Felixstowe Docks and occasionally Shotley, Suffolk. Passed to LNER, British Railways and Orwell and Harwich Navigation Co. Ltd., who re-opened Felixstowe Docks service in 1962.
SS Bruges	1920	2,949	Built by John Brown and Company at Clydebank for the Harwich – Antwerp service. Bombed and sunk at Le Havre in 1940
SS Brussels	1902	1,380	Built by Gourlay Brothers, of Dundee for the Harwich – Antwerp service. Switched to Tilbury – Rotterdam when Harwich taken over by Admiralty in 1914. Captured by Germany in 1916 under command of Capt.Charles Fryatt who was tried and executed for an earlier war-like act. Scuttled 1918 at Zeebrugge. The ship was raised in 1919, sold at auction and repaired in 1920. She was eventually scrapped in 1929.
SS Cambridge	1886	1,196	Built by Earle's Shipbuilding of Hull for service from Harwich and her career included Antwerp, Rotterdam and Hook of Holland routes. Sold in 1912 to Anglo-Ottoman Steamship Company.
SS Chelmsford	1893	1,635	Built by Earle's Shipbuilding of Hull for the Harwich – Hook of Holland service. The first triple expansion vessel for the company and inaugurated the new terminal at Hook of Holland in June 1893. Sold in 1910 to the Great Western Railway and renamed Bretonne where she was placed on the Plymouth – Nantes route.
SS Clacton	1904	820	Built by Earle's Shipbuilding in 1904. Sunk during the First World War in 1917.
PS Claud Hamilton	1875	922	Built by John Elder and Company, who were later known as Fairfield Shipbuilding and Engineering Company in Govan and launched the Harwich – Hook of Holland service. The vessel was named after the chairman of the company. Sold in 1897 to the City of London as a cattle carrier. Vessel broken up in 1914.
SS Colchester	1889	1,160	Built by Earle's Shipbuilding of Hull and with her sister "Cambridge" operated the three main routes from Harwich. Was operating to neutral Holland when captured by Germany in 1916. She grounded at Kiel in 1918 and was scrapped in 1919.
SS Copenhagen	1907	2,570	Built by John Brown and Company at Clydebank as a replacement for the lost "Berlin" and was so successful that she was quickly followed by her sisters "Munich" [1908] and "St. Petersburg"[1910] on the Harwich – Hook of Holland service. The vessel was torpedoed and sunk in the North Sea in 1917 en route to Hook of Holland.
SS Cromer	1902	812	A freight vessel which served until 1934.
SS Dresden	1896	1,805	Built by Earle's Shipbuilding of Hull for the Harwich – Antwerp service. Dr.Rudolf Diesel was travelling on the vessel in 1913 when he disappeared overboard in uncertain circumstances. The vessel was requisitioned by the Admiralty in 1915 and renamed Louvain, and was lost when torpedoed in the Aegean Sea in 1918.
MV Epping	1914	21	Small launch used between Harwich and Shotley, Suffolk.
PS Essex	1896	297	Built by Earle's Shipbuilding of Hull and employed on local services and coastal excursions from Harwich. Sold in 1913 and became a River Thames excursion vessel.
SS Felixstowe	1918	892	Built by Hawthorns of Leith as a cargo steamer. Renamed HMS Colchester in 1942 and back to Felixstowe in 1946. Sold in 1951 to the Limerick Steam Ship Company and renamed Kylemore.
SS Frinton	1903	1,419	Previously Kilkenny, the vessel served the Harwich – Antwerp route. She passed to the LNER in 1923 and was sold on again in 1926.
SS Great Yarmouth	1866	731	A freight vessel which served the Harwich – Antwerp route from 1866 to 1873.
MV Hainault	1914	21	Small launch used between Harwich and Shotley, Suffolk.
PS Ipswich	1864	87	Built by James Ash of Cubitt Town on the River Thames she served as a river steamer between Ipswich and Harwich. She was the first GER vessel having replaced the "Cardinal Wolsey" which was an Eastern Counties Railway ship on this service. Withdrawn 1873.
SS Ipswich	1883	1,067	Built by Earle's Shipbuilding of Hull, she was designed with her sister "Norwich" for the company's new quay at Parkeston, Essex. Operated on the Antwerp service until retired in 1905. Sold in 1906 to Shah Steam Navigation Co, Bombay, where she was broken up in 1909.
SS Kilkenny	1903	1,419	Purchased in 1917 from City of Dublin Steam Packet Company, renamed Frinton in 1919. She was built at Port Glasgow and served on the Dublin – Liverpool and Cork – Liverpool routes.
PS Lady Tyler	1880	995	Built by T and W Smith at North Shields she operated on the Harwich – Rotterdam service. Sold in 1893 to Earle's Shipbuilding of Hull.
SS Malines	1921	2,969	Built by Armstrong Whitworth and Company at Newcastle, she was the final steamer ordered by the GER and entered service on the Harwich – Antwerp route. She was torpedoed by an air attack and was beached off Port Said in July 1942. Having been raised in September 1943 and towed back to her builders, the machinery damage caused her to be laid up 1945 and finally scrapped in 1948.
PS Middlesex	1879	103	Built in 1879 for the Woolwich Ferry and used in 1908.
SS Munich	1908	2,570	Built by John Brown and Company of Clydebank for the Harwich – Hook of Holland service. A sister of "Copenhagen". Requisitioned in 1918, renamed St Denis and converted to a hospital ship. She retained her new name on return to GER and passed to LNER in 1923. She was relegated to relief and secondary services in 1932. Was scuttled when cornered in Amsterdam in 1940. Having been raised by the Germans, she had her name changed to "Barbara" and was found in Kiel in 1945 where she served as an accommodation ship for Kiel University. In 1950 she was towed to Sunderland and scrapped.
SS Newmarket	1907	833	Built by Earle's Shipbuilding in 1907. Sunk during the First World War in 1918.
PS Norfolk	1882	295	Built on the Thames she was employed on summer excursions from Harwich to Felixstowe and Ipswich. Sold to the Eastham Ferry Pleasure Gardens and Hotel Company in 1897 and renamed Onyx.
PS Norfolk	1900	295	Built by Gourlay Brothers, of Dundee. Used on local services and coastal excursions. Passed to LNER in 1923 and withdrawn in 1931. Scrapped in 1935.
SS Norwich	1883	1,062	Built by Earle's Shipbuilding at Hull as a sister to "Ipswich" for the Harwich – Antwerp service. Sold in 1905 to Channel Drydock & Shipbuilding Company, Harwich. Re-sold several times to companies in Cape Verde, Montevideo, New York and Mexico and sank in 1920.
PS Orwell	1873	114	Built by Lewis and Stockwell in London and operated on Ipswich – Harwich ferry service with her sister "Stour". Sold in 1890 for scrapping.
PS Pacific	1864	700	Built in 1864 by C. Lungley of Deptford, this ship was acquired by the Great Eastern Railway in 1872 and withdrawn in 1887
MV Pin Mill	1912	11	Small launch used between Harwich and Shotley. Withdrawn from ferry service in 1925, converted to work boat. Still in service in 1985.
PS Princess of Wales	1878	1,098	Built by London and Glasgow Shipbuilding Company at Govan. Entered Harwich – Rotterdam service and transferred to the Hook of Holland service when it opened in 1893. Sold and scrapped in May 1896.
PS Richard Young	1871	718	Built by J & W Dudgeon at Cubitt Town in London. Served on the Harwich – Rotterdam service. Converted to single screw propulsion by Earle's Shipbuilding of Hull and was renamed Brandon in 1890.
SS Roulers	1894	1,753	Built by Earle's Shipbuilding at Hull and was launched as "Vienna". Entered Harwich – Hook of Holland service with sister "Amsterdam" Was transferred to the Antwerp service in 1910. Renamed "Roulers" when she entered Harwich – Zeebrugge service in 1920. Passed to LNER in 1923. Was withdrawn and scrapped in 1930.
SS St Denis	1908	2,570	Built by John Brown and Company at Clydebank and launched as "Munich" for the Harwich – Hook of Holland service. Renamed "St. Denis" in 1914 and returned to GER service with the new name after the war. Passed to LNER in 1923 and relegated to relief work in 1932. Scuttled in 1940 at Amsterdam, salvaged by the Germans and repaired. Scrapped 1950.
St George	1906	2,456	Built by Cammell Laird at Birkenhead for the GWR and was sold to Canadian interests in 1913. Purchased from the Canadian Pacific Railway in 1919 by GER. Passed to LNER in 1923 and scrapped in 1929.
PS Stour	1864	87	Built by James Ash at Cubitt Town on the River Thames. A sister of "Ipswich" and operated as a river steamer from Ipswich to Harwich. Withdrawn in 1878 and replaced by a slightly larger newbuilding with the same name.
PS Stour	1878	112	Built by Thames Ironworks and Shipbuilding Company and a sister of the "Orwell". Based in Ipswich for the river service to Harwich. Replaced slightly smaller vessel of same name. Sold in 1900 for River Thames river service.
SS St Petersburg	1910	2,570	Built by John Brown and Company of Clydebank. A sister of the very successful "Copenhagen" for the Harwich – Hook of Holland service. Renamed Archangel in 1916 and used a cross-channel troop ship. Resumed service after the war and passed to LNER in 1923. The vessel was bombed and sank off Scotland in 1941.
PS Suffolk	1895	245	Built by Earle's Shipbuilding of Hull and employed on local services and coastal excursions from Harwich. Used as a picket ship at Harwich from 1914 to 1918. re-opened her pre-war services in 1919. Withdrawn in 1931.
SS Vienna	1894	1,753	Built by Earle's Shipbuilding as a sister for "Amsterdam". Entered Hook of Holland service. Transferred to the Antwerp service in 1910. Renamed Roulers in 1920 when transferred to the Harwich – Zeebrugge route. Passed to LNER in 1923 and withdrawn in 1930.
PS Woolwich	1890	148	Built as a sister to PS Middlesex for the Woolwich Ferry Service. Sold in 1908 to David Wilson and Sons for the service between North and South Queensferry on the Forth.
SS Yarmouth	1903	805	Built by Gourlay Brothers, Dundee, for the Rotterdam–Harwich cargo service. Sank with all hands in the North Sea on 27 October 1908.
PS Zealous	1864	613	Built by J & W Dudgeon at Cubitt Town on the Thames. Served on the Harwich – Rotterdam and Antwerp routes. Scrapped in 1887.

=== Cranes ===
The GER had a total of 11 breakdown cranes. Numbers 1a, 2a and 3a were built at Stratford Works in 1885 initially as hand cranes. They were converted to steam cranes at Stratford c. 1905/06 and lasted into LNER days.

Three examples built by Cowans, Sheldon & Company were purchased between 1892 and 1899. With lifting capacity of 10–12 long tons (10–12 t) they were employed on permanent way work.

Three more cranes (numbers 4a, 5a and unnumbered) were also built at Stratford c1907. The unnumbered example was lost at sea during the First World War whilst in War Department use. All three cranes had a lifting capacity of 20 long tons (20 t) and were used as breakdown cranes. 4a and 5a worked from Ipswich (until 1967) and March (until 1962).

The last two cranes (number 6a and SB4) were built by Ransomes & Rapier of Ipswich in 1913 and 1919. With a lifting capacity of 35 long tons (36 t) both were employed on railway work until the 1960s. During LNER days SB4 was frequently used at publicity events to give people an aerial ride in an old wagon body. While 6a was transferred away from the GER shortly after 1923, SB4 was allocated to Stratford, Norwich and March before moving north to the Sheffield area.

=== Buses and horses ===
The May 1911 issue of the Great Eastern Railway Magazine (the in-house magazine of the GER) stated the company had 1,750 horses the majority of which worked in the London area. Some wagon shunting work was carried out by horses but they would have found widespread work hauling delivery carts.

The Great Eastern built buses at Stratford and ran a number of omnibus services including Halesworth to Southwold.

== Hotels and other business interests ==
The GER owned five hotels at the end of their existence in 1922.

=== The Great Eastern Hotel ===
The Great Eastern Hotel was located at Liverpool Street Railway station opened in May 1884 and enlarged in 1901. This was the biggest hotel on the system. The large function room known as the Hamilton Hall was restored in the 1990s and re-opened as a pub. The hotel is still open today.

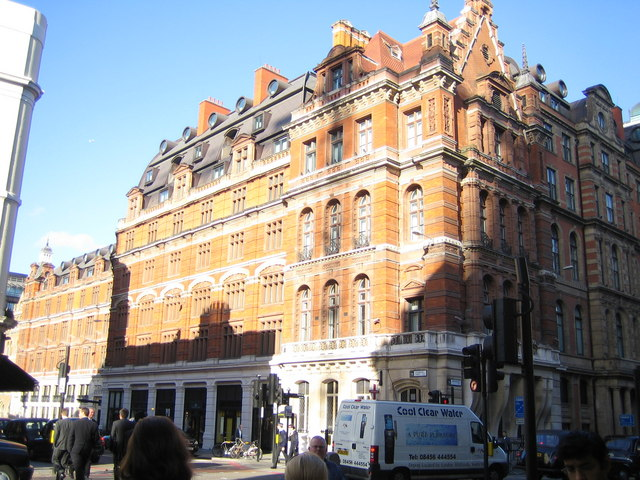
Great Eastern Hotel, Liverpool Street, EC2 - geograph.org.uk - 609014

=== The Felix Hotel ===
The Felix Hotel located in Felixstowe was purchased by the GER in the 1920s. Built by the local Tollemache family (of brewing fame) in 1902, the hotel was lavishly equipped with tennis courts, winter gardens, a putting course, croquet lawns and a squash court. Hugely popular when Felixstowe was a resort by the 1930s it was in decline and sold to Fisons in 1952. Visitors included Kaiser Wilhelm in 1891 and in later post GER days, Wallis Simpson and Fred Perry. In the 1980s the building - then named Harvest House – was converted to apartments.

=== The Harwich Hotel ===
This was opened in 1865 and, although well-equipped and furnished, struggled to make a profit (especially after Parkeston Quay opened). The GER tried to sell it in early 1907 but it failed to meet its reserve price so closed in July 1907.

The GER refurbished the hotel and re-opened it in 1912 but when the First World War started in 1914 it became a naval hospital. After the war the GER opened the hotel again, but it closed in 1923. It was later used as council offices.

=== The Parkeston Quay Hotel ===
This hotel was opened in 1883 when the continental steamer services were transferred from Harwich. It had 26 rooms. It was part of the station buildings – later used as shipping agent's offices.

=== Sandringham Hotel ===
The Sandringham Hotel at Hunstanton was opened on 1 May 1876 and built by the Lynn and Hunstanton Railway. It was not acquired by the GER until 1 July 1890 when the Great Eastern, Hunstanton and West Norfolk Railway Companies Act 1890 (53 & 54 Vict. c. xiii) incorporated the Hunstanton and West Norfolk Railway. The GER expanded the premises in the early 1900s with rooms numbering over 100. The hotel prospered until the Second World War where it first housed the LNER accounts department and was then requisitioned by the War Department and used by various British and Canadian regiments during the rest of the war.

It was bought by Hunstanton Urban District Council in 1950 and used as offices and a library until 1959 when the property was converted into flats. The building was demolished in 1967. (Note: There may have been an earlier Railway Hotel on the same site as the Sandringham Hotel which was opened by the Hunstanton and West Norfolk Railway (which avoided Hunstanton and terminated at Heacham just to the south). Both Summers and the first article on the subject by Mike Brooks are unclear about this.)

=== Laundry ===
The GER built a laundry in 1888 in Colchester that supplied the hotels with bed linen, tablecloths etc. At one point it employed 70 people.

=== Farming ===
During 1916 the GER ran a poultry demonstration trains throughout East Anglia often visiting towns on market day. The purpose of this train was to encourage self-sufficiency during the food shortages of the First World War. Encouraged by the reception this train got, the GER purchased Dodnash Priory Farm in Bentley, Suffolk as a poultry demonstration farm. The hen houses were built at Stratford Works and had individual works numbers. By 1920 the farm was producing 40,000 eggs per month for the GER as well as chickens, turkeys, fruit and vegetables for the GER hotels, restaurants, dining cars and buffets. Another establishment at Chigwell has been doing this for some years previously.

Dodnash Priory also served as a rest home for GER horses. A siding about three-quarters of a mile south of Bentley railway station on the down side served the farm.

The farm survived into LNER days being sold in 1927 when the farmer reached 70 and retired. The siding had been removed in May 1925.

=== Stratford Market ===
Stratford Market was founded by the GER in 1879 as a wholesale fruit and vegetable market as a competitor to the City of London's Spitalfields Market. The market also had an extensive goods depot and a nearby railway station.

== People ==
=== Chairmen ===
The chairmen of the Great Eastern Railway were:

- Horatio Love 1862–1863 - a stockbroker and former chairman of the Eastern Counties Railway.
- James Goodson 1863-1866 - a solicitor
- Charles Turner 1866-1868 (continued as vice chairman after 1868)
- Viscount Cranborne 1868–1871 (Note: Formerly Lord Cranborne and later the Marquess of Salisbury)
- Lightly Simpson 1872–1874 (Note: Born in Tadcaster in 1810. He became a director of the Wharfedale Railway in 1846 and on 29 August 1849 he was elected as an auditor for the Manchester, Sheffield and Lincolnshire Railway. In the 1850s further railway directorships followed including that of the East Anglian Railways which later became part of the Eastern Counties Railway and then in 1862 the Great Eastern Railway. In 1869 Simpson became vice-chairman of the GER and in 1872 chairman. He resigned in November 1874 stating "I cannot continue to hold office with advantage to the Company or pleasure to myself" although he remained a director of the GER until his death in 1883.)
- Charles Henry Parkes 1874–1893
- Lord Claud Hamilton 1893–1922

Viscount Cranborne went on to be the British prime minister between 1885 and 1892 and between 1895 and 1903. Parkeston Quay is named after C. H. Parkes and the Great Eastern 4-4-0 class was named after Claud Hamilton.

Some details of other directors can be found here.

=== General Managers ===
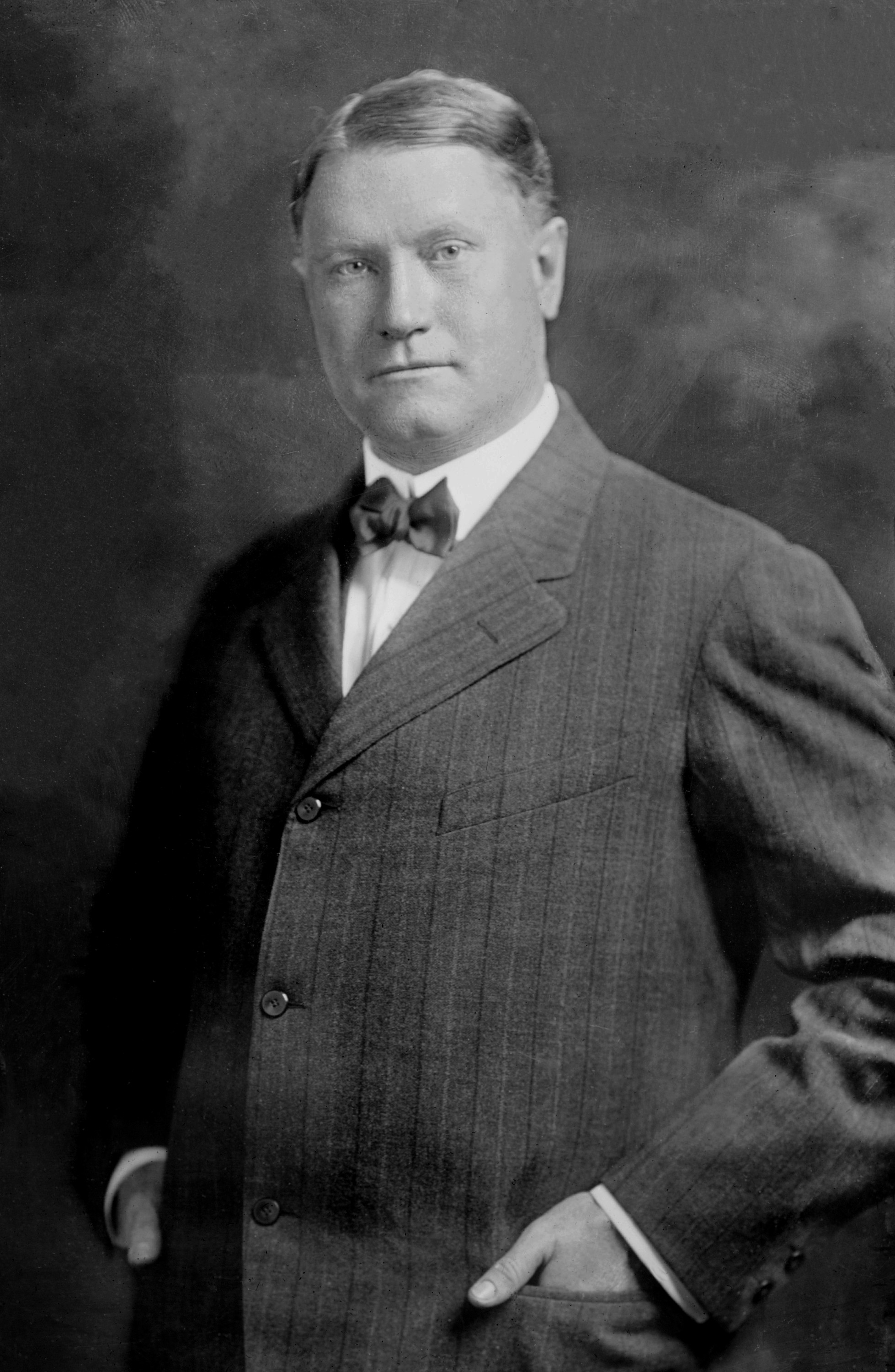
Sir Henry Worth Thornton

- Robert Moseley 1866 - 1868
- Samuel Swarbrick 1868 - 1880 (formerly Chief Accountant to the Midland Railway)
- William Birt 1880 - 1899
- John Francis S. Gooday 1899 - 1914 (formerly General Manager of the London, Brighton and South Coast Railway)
- Walter Henry Hyde 1910 - 1914
- Colonel Sir Henry Worth Thornton 1914 - 1922 (afterwards General Manager of Canadian National Railways)
- Sidney Arthur Parnwell 1922 - 1923 (formerly assistant General Manager)

=== Superintendents of the Line ===
- James Robertson ca. 1863 - 1889
- J.H.Nettleship 1889 - 1897
- Henry George Drury 1897 - 1904 (formerly Assistant Superintendent of the Line)
- Robert Powley Ellis 1904 - 1910
- Frederick Garwood Randall 1910 - 1914

The role was changed in 1914 to Chief Traffic Manager

- William Clacy May 1914 - 1918

=== Chief mechanical engineers ===
The chief mechanical engineers of the Great Eastern Railway were:

- 1862–1866 Robert Sinclair
- 1866–1873 Samuel W. Johnson
- 1873–1878 William Adams
- 1878–1881 Massey Bromley
- 1881–1885 Thomas William Worsdell
- 1885–1907 James Holden
- 1908–1912 S. D. Holden
- 1912–1922 Alfred John Hill
