= PS Adelaide (1880) =

History

United Kingdom
- Name: Adelaide
- Operator: Great Eastern Railway
- Port of registry: Harwich
- Builder: Barrow Ship Building Company
- Yard number: 74
- Launched: 8 May 1880
- Out of service: 1896
- Identification: UK official number 81173
- Fate: Hulked 1897

General characteristics
- Tonnage: 976 GRT, 553 NRT
- Length: 254.2 ft (77.5 m)
- Beam: 32.3 ft (9.8 m)
- Depth: 13.0 ft (4.0 m)
- Propulsion: oscillating steam engine

PS Adelaide was a passenger paddle steamer built for the Great Eastern Railway (GER) in 1880.

== History ==
The Barrow Shipbuilding Company built Adelaide for the Great Eastern Railway. She was launched on 8 May 1880. She was launched by Mrs. Adelaide Simpson, the wife of Mr. Lightly Simpson, a director of the GER Company. She was the GER's first steel-hulled ship, and its last paddle steamer. She was intended for the Harwich – Rotterdam service.

In 1885 the GER launched its twice-weekly morning service to mainland Europe. A train was scheduled to leave London Liverpool Street Station at 9.00am to Harwich, where it connected with the paddle steamer Adelaide which left at 11.00am to arrive in Antwerp the same evening. There was a corresponding return service from Antwerp on Tuesdays and Fridays, reaching London the same night. The company also offered a daily weekday service which left Liverpool Street at 8.00pm every evening, with a connecting boat service overnight to Antwerp and Rotterdam, with arrivals early the following morning.

In 1896 Adelaide was withdrawn from service. In 1897 Thos. W. Ward hulked her at Preston, Lancashire.
