= SS Kilkenny =

History
- Name: 1903–1919: SS Kilkenny; 1919–1941: SS Frinton
- Operator: 1903–1917: City of Dublin Steam Packet Company; 1917–1923: Great Eastern Railway; 1923–1927: London and North Eastern Railway; 1927–1928: Samos Steamship Navigation Company, London; 1928–1941: D Inglessi fils SA de Navigation., Samos
- Port of registry: (United Kingdom)
- Builder: Clyde Shipbuilding Company, Port Glasgow
- Yard number: 254
- Launched: 30 December 1903
- Fate: Bombed and sunk at Megara 22 April 1941

General characteristics
- Tonnage: 1,316 gross register tons (GRT)
- Length: 269.7 feet (82.2 m)
- Beam: 36.2 feet (11.0 m)
- Draught: 16.3 feet (5.0 m)

SS Kilkenny was a passenger vessel built for the City of Dublin Steam Packet Company in 1903.

== History ==
The ship was built by the Clyde Shipbuilding Company in Port Glasgow for the City of Dublin Steam Packet Company and launched on 30 December 1903. She was placed on the Liverpool to Dublin service.

In 1917 she was purchased by the Great Eastern Railway and in 1919 renamed SS Frinton. She was then acquired by the London and North Eastern Railway in 1923. She was sold in 1927 to Samos Steam Navigation Company in London and again in 1928 to D Inglessi Fils SA de Navigation, Samos.

She was bombed by Luftwaffe aircraft at Megara during the German invasion of Greece and sunk on 22 April 1941.
