= PS Lady Tyler =

History
- Name: 1880–1897: PS Lady Tyler; 1897–????: PS Artemis
- Operator: 1880–1893: Great Eastern Railway; 1893–????: Earle's Shipbuilding and Engineering Company, Hull; ????: George Sandford, Kent
- Port of registry: (United Kingdom)
- Builder: T and W Smith, North Shields
- Yard number: 69
- Launched: 12 January 1880
- Completed: 20 May 1880
- Out of service: 1955
- Fate: Scrapped

General characteristics
- Tonnage: 995 gross register tons (GRT)
- Length: 261 feet (80 m)
- Beam: 30.2 feet (9.2 m)
- Draught: 13.8 feet (4.2 m)

PS Lady Tyler was a passenger vessel built for the Great Eastern Railway in 1880.

== History ==
The ship was built by T and W Smith in North Shields for the Great Eastern Railway and launched on 12 January 1880. She was launched by Miss Luckley, daughter of G. Luckley, a member of the firm of T and W Smith, and named after Lady Tyler, the wife of Sir Henry Tyler, chairman of the Grand Trunk Railway Company of Canada, and the conservative candidate for Harwich.

On 6 May 1880, she ran aground on the Black Middens, off the mouth of the River Tyne. She was refloated the next day. Lady Tyler was placed on the Harwich to Rotterdam route.

In 1893 she was disposed of by the railway company and sold to Earle’s Shipbuilding and Engineering Company in Hull. She was then used for transporting coal.

On 25 May 1895 she launched a new steamship service between Liverpool and Douglas by the Mutual Line of Manx Steamers Limited. The new service had an inauspicious start however, when Lady Tyler collided with the Isle of Man Steam Packet company ship Mona's Isle on 4 June 1895 when arriving into Liverpool after an overnight sailing from Douglas. After a week of repairs she returned to service but on Saturday 15 June 1895 she collided with Victoria Pier, and sustained damage. She ceased running for the Mutual Line of Manx Steamers on 22 July 1895, and the company was wound up later that year.

In 1897 she was renamed Artemis.

She was sold by 1905 to George Sandford, and used as a coal hulk in Gravesend until around 1955.
