= SS Yarmouth (1903) =

Steamship (1903–1908)

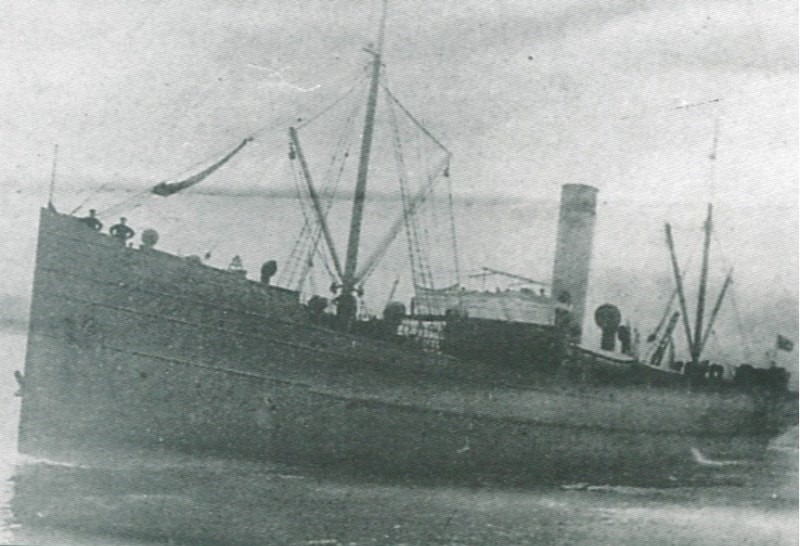
- TSS Yarmouth

History

United Kingdom
- Name: SS Yarmouth
- Owner: Great Eastern Railway
- Operator: Great Eastern Railway
- Port of registry: Harwich, United Kingdom
- Route: Harwich to Hook of Holland and Rotterdam
- Builder: Gourlay Brothers, Dundee
- Yard number: 208
- Launched: 18 March 1903
- Completed: 4 June 1903
- Identification: United Kingdom Official Number 116175
- Fate: Foundered on 27 October 1908

General characteristics
- Tonnage: 805 GRT
- Length: 245 ft 3.5 in (74.76 m)
- Beam: 31.15 ft (9.49 m)
- Draught: 15 ft 4 in (4.67 m)
- Depth: 15.35 ft (4.68 m)
- Installed power: Two reciprocating steam engines, 170 NHP. Effect: 1,650 IHP
- Propulsion: Twin screw propellers
- Sail plan: Schooner
- Speed: Cruising: 14.5 kn (26.9 km/h).
- Crew: 21

The SS Yarmouth was a steel-hulled steamship owned by the Great Eastern Railway. She was built in 1903 for use on their cargo service between Harwich, Essex, and the Hook of Holland and Rotterdam, the Netherlands. She was lost at sea with all hands on 27 October 1908.

== Description ==
Yarmouth was 245 feet 3.5 inches (74.76 m) long with a beam of 31.15 feet (9.49 m). She had a draught of 15 feet 4 inches (4.67 m) and a depth of 15.35 feet (4.68 m). The vessel was powered by two triple expansion steam engines of 170 NHP (1,650 IHP) driving twin screw propellers. Steam was supplied by two boilers working at a pressure of 180psi. These gave her a speed of 14.5 knots (26.9 km/h). She was rigged as a schooner.

== History ==
Yarmouth was built in 1903 as yard number 208 by Gourlay Brothers, Dundee, Perthshire. Built at a cost of £35,000, she was launched on 18 March 1903 and delivered to the Great Eastern Railway on 4 June. Her port of registry was Harwich, Essex. The United Kingdom Official Number 116175 was allocated.

Yarmouth had an uneventful five-year career on the Harwich–Hook of Holland route. She underwent a routine inspection and minor repairs by Earle's Shipbuilding, Hull, Yorkshire, between 13 and 17 September 1908.

== Loss ==
Yarmouth was lost in circumstances that have never been fully explained. The ship left the Hook of Holland having taken on cargo both there and at Rotterdam. At Rotterdam 343 long tons (349 metric tons) of varied cargo had been loaded and at the Hook a further 88.65 long tons (90.07 metric tons) of meat was loaded and as the holds were already quite full, some of this cargo of cased meat was stowed on the forecastle and poop deck. Carrying a crew of 21 and one passenger (a relative of one of the ship's engineers) the Yarmouth sailed from the Hook at 10:30 am on 27 October 1908 and was next observed at 4:30 pm the same day by the crew of the Outer Gabbard Lightship. The lightship crew observed that the Yarmouth was listing heavily to starboard, so severely in fact, that the master of the lightship made a specific comment to this effect in his log. At about 5:30 pm the lightship crew lost sight of the Yarmouth in misty rain, this was the last known sighting of the ship. Four hours later, the crew of a Norwegian ship, the Fredheim en route from Honfleur, Manche, France to Hull, saw debris in the water and heard cries. The crew of the Fredheim searched for two hours but found no sign of the Yarmouth or its crew.

The following morning, the ship was reported to be missing. It was initially thought that there had probably been a problem with her engines being the reason she had not arrived at Harwich. No distress signal having been received. A Royal Navy cruiser, HMS Blake recovered a body wearing a lifebelt marked Yarmouth, and sighted wreckage not too far from the Outer Gabbard Lightship at 52°00′06″N 2°07′00″E, and 20 nautical miles (37 km) east of Harwich. Another of the Great Eastern Railway's ships, the Vienna sailed from Harwich and recovered further debris and wreckage identified as being from the Yarmouth at a location 7 nautical miles (13 km) north east ½ north of the Outer Gabbard Lightship. She returned to Harwich flying her flag at half-mast.

== Court of inquiry ==
A Board of Trade inquiry into the loss of the Yarmouth was held at the Caxton Hall, Westminster, London in February and March 1909. The court reported its findings on 4 March 1909 and concluded that the loss of the Yarmouth be attributed to carrying deck cargo (the crated meat on the poop and forecastle) which caused the ship to list to starboard and eventually causing the ship to capsize before the crew could attempt to save themselves. As a result of the loss of the Yarmouth the Great Eastern Railway discontinued the practice of carrying deck cargoes on all its vessels.
