= PS Orwell =

History
- Name: PS Orwell
- Operator: Great Eastern Railway
- Port of registry: (United Kingdom)
- Builder: Lewis and Stockwell, London
- Launched: 1873
- Out of service: 1890
- Fate: Scrapped

General characteristics
- Tonnage: 114 gross register tons (GRT)
- Length: 125.5 feet (38.3 m)
- Beam: 17.5 feet (5.3 m)
- Depth: 6.9 feet (2.1 m)

PS Orwell was a passenger vessel built for the Great Eastern Railway in 1873. The vessel was a paddle steamer.

== History ==
The ship was built by Lewis and Stockwell in London in 1873. She was placed in excursion service on the River Orwell, between Ipswich and Harwich.

On 27 May 1890 she collided with the Stour on the River Orwell at Cage Bend. The force of the impact was so great that the bow of the Orwell stoved in, leaving a large hole which resulted in water pouring into the vessel. One of the paddle boxes was carried away. Captain Coe ran the Orwell ashore, and the passengers were transferred to the Stour.

Probably as a result of the damage sustained, she was sold for scrapping later that year.
