= PS Suffolk =

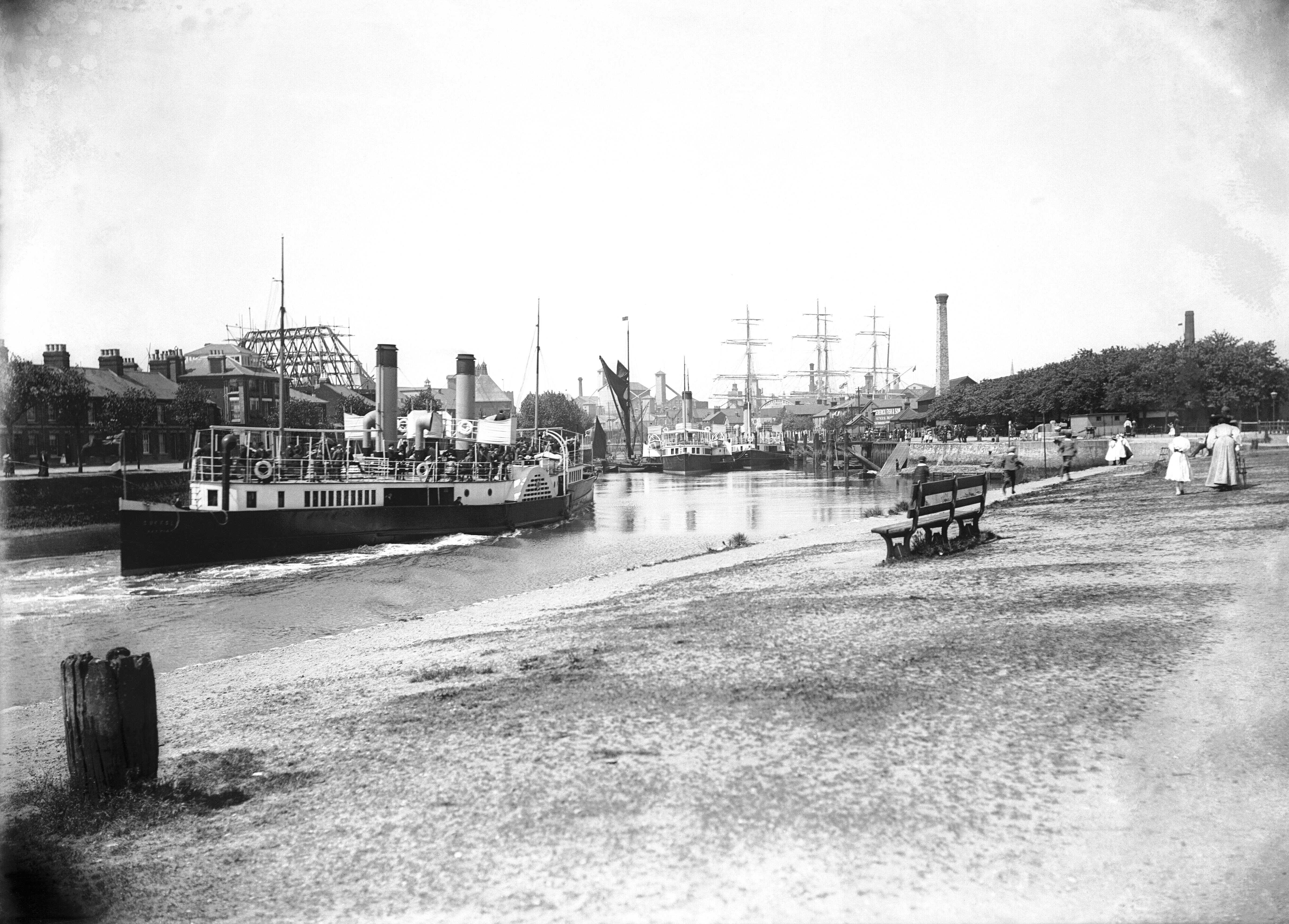
- PS Suffolk arriving in Ipswich, May 1904

History
- Name: PS Suffolk
- Operator: 1895–1923: Great Eastern Railway; 1923–1931: London and North Eastern Railway
- Port of registry: (United Kingdom)
- Builder: Earle's Shipbuilding, Hull
- Launched: 13 May 1895
- Out of service: 1931
- Fate: Scrapped 1931

General characteristics
- Tonnage: 245 gross register tons (GRT)
- Length: 165 feet (50 m)
- Beam: 21 feet (6.4 m)
- Depth: 7.3 feet (2.2 m)

PS Suffolk was a passenger vessel built for the Great Eastern Railway in 1895.

== History ==
The ship was built by Earle's Shipbuilding in Hull for the Great Eastern Railway and launched on 25 April 1900. She was launched by Miss Nellie Howard, daughter of Captain D. Howard, the Marine Superintendent of the Great Eastern Railway Company. She was built of steel and equipped with a double-ended hull, with two rudders adapted for steaming with equal facility astern or ahead. Unusually she was launched with machinery on board complete, and with steam up, and she made a short run on the Humber estuary, prior to being berthed in the Victoria Dock

She was used on local services and coastal excursions.

In 1923 she passed into the ownership of the London and North Eastern Railway and they scrapped her in 1931.
