= Locomotives of the Great Eastern Railway =

The Great Eastern Railway was formed on 1 August 1862, when the Eastern Counties Railway changed its name. The ECR had originally been built to 5 ft (1,524 mm) gauge, was converted to 4 ft 8 1/2 in (1,435 mm) standard gauge in September and October 1844.

== Robert Sinclair (1856–1866) ==
Image	Class	Type	Quantity	Manufacturer	Date	Notes
		2-2-2	6		1856–59	
	Z	2-4-0	6	Rothwell & Co.	1858	
	Y	2-4-0	110	Neilson & Co. (20); R. Stephenson & Co. (15); R. & W. Hawthorn & Co. (15); Kitson & Co. (25); Vulcan Foundry (25); Schneider & Cie. (10)	1859–66	20 later rebuilt as 4-4-0 between 1876–78; 10 rebuilt as class U13 in 1882 (see below)
	X	2-4-0T	5	Stratford Works	1862	
	W	2-2-2	31	Wm. Fairbairn & Sons (5); Slaughter, Grüning & Co. (10); Kitson & Co. (10); Schneider & Cie. (6)	1862–67	Two rebuilt as 4-2-2 in 1873
	V	2-4-2T	20	Neilson & Co.	1864–65	

== Samuel Waite Johnson (1866–1873) ==
Image	Class	Type	Quantity	Manufacturer	Date	Notes
	125	2-4-0	5	Neilson & Co.	1867	
	201	0-6-0ST	1	Hudswell, Clarke & Co.	1867	
	202	0-6-0ST	1	Hudswell, Clarke & Co.	1867	
	1	2-4-0	40	Sharp, Stewart & Co. (30); Stratford Works (10)	1867–72	"Little Sharpies"
	417	0-6-0	60	Neilson & Co. (20); Worcester Engine Co. (40)	1867–69	
	204	0-6-0T	5	Ruston, Proctor & Co.	1868	Three converted to crane-tanks "B", "C" and "D"; LNER Class Z4, later class J92
	116	2-4-0	3	Stratford Works	1868–69	
	73	2-2-2	2	Stratford Works	1870	
	477	0-6-0	50	Beyer, Peacock & Co. (20); R. Stephenson & Co. (5); Dübs & Co. (5); Nasmyth, Wilson & Co. (5); Yorkshire Engine Co. (15)	1871–73	
	T7	0-4-2T	15	Stratford Works	1871–75	
	200	0-4-0ST	1	Manning, Wardle & Co.	1872	renumbered as "A"
	134	0-4-4T	30	Neilson & Co. (15); Avonside Engine Co. (15)	1872–73	

== William Adams (1873–1878) ==
Image	Class	Type	Quantity	Manufacturer	Date	Notes
	C8	4-4-0	2	Stratford Works	1874	
	209	0-4-0ST	4	Neilson & Co.	1874–76	LNER Class Y5; two more built in 1897; another two in 1903 (see below)
	61	0-4-4T	50	Neilson & Co. (25); R. Stephenson & Co (10); Kitson & Co. (10)	1875–78	
	265	4-4-0	20	Dübs & Co. (10); R. & W. Hawthorn & Co. (10)	1876–77	"Ironclads"
	K9	0-4-2T	10	Stratford Works	1877–78	
	230	0-4-0Tram	1	Kitson & Co.	1878	
	527	2-6-0	15	Neilson & Co.	1878–79	

== Massey Bromley (1878–1881) ==
Image	Class	Type	Quantity	Manufacturer	Date	Notes
	E10	0-4-4T	60	Stratford Works	1878–83	
	245	4-2-2	20	Dübs & Co. (10); Kitson & Co. (10)	1879–82	
	140	0-4-4T	10	R. & W. Hawthorn, Leslie & Co.	1880	Converted to 0-4-2T 1891–97
	M12	0-6-0T	10	Stratford Works	1881	
	552	0-6-0	10	Kitson & Co.	1882	
	U13	2-4-0	10	Stratford Works	1882	Rebuilds of Class Y (above)

== Thomas William Worsdell (1882–1885) ==
Image	Class	Type	Quantity	Manufacturer	Date	LNER Class	Notes
	G14	2-4-0	20	Stratford Works	1882–83		
	Y14	0-6-0	69	Stratford Works (50); Sharp, Stewart & Co. (19)	1883–86	J15	Another 200 built 1886–1906; another 20 built 1912–13
	G15	0-4-0Tram	10	Stratford Works	1883–97	Y6	
	M15	2-4-2T	30	Stratford Works	1884–86	F4	Another 130 built 1886–1909
	G16	4-4-0	11	Stratford Works	1884–85		Compound

== James Holden (1885–1907) ==
Image	Class	Type	Quantity	Manufacturer	Date	LNER Class	Notes
	T18	0-6-0T	50	Stratford Works	1886–88	J66	
	T19	2-4-0	110	Stratford Works	1886–97	D13	60 rebuilt as 4-4-0 in 1905–08
	Y14	0-6-0	200	Stratford Works	1886–1906	J15	Continuation of T. W. Worsdell design; another 20 built 1912–13
	M15	2-4-2T	130	Stratford Works	1886–1909	F4	Continuation of T. W. Worsdell design; 32 rebuilt as class M15R (LNER F5)
	127	0-6-0	1	Stratford Works	1887	—	Compound, later rebuilt as N31
	E22	0-6-0T	20	Stratford Works	1888–93	J65	
	D27	2-2-2	21	Stratford Works	1888–93	—	
	R24	0-6-0T	140	Stratford Works	1890–1901	J67	89 Rebuilt as S56
	T26	2-4-0	100	Stratford Works	1891–1902	E4	"Intermediate"
	C32	2-4-2T	50	Stratford Works	1893–1902	F3	
	N31	0-6-0	81	Stratford Works	1893–97	J14	
	209	0-4-0ST	4	Stratford Works	1897, 1903	Y5	
	P43	4-2-2	10	Stratford Works	1898	—	
	S44	0-4-4T	40	Stratford Works	1898–1901	G4	
	S46	4-4-0	41	Stratford Works	1900–02	D14	"Claud Hamilton" (round-top firebox)
	F48	0-6-0	59	Stratford Works	1900–03	J16	all eventually rebuilt as J17
	G58	0-6-0	31	Stratford Works	1900–11	J17	
	A55	0-10-0T	1	Stratford Works	1902	—	"Decapod" - Rebuilt as 0-8-0 tender engine in 1906
	D56	4-4-0	70	Stratford Works	1903–11	D15	"Claud Hamilton" (Belpaire firebox)
	C53	0-6-0Tram	12	Stratford Works	1903–21	J70	
	S56	0-6-0T	20	Stratford Works	1904	J69	Another 89 rebuilt from R24
	A55R	0-8-0	1	Stratford Works	1906	–	Rebuilt from the "Decapod" above

== Stephen Dewar Holden (1908–1912) ==
Image	Class	Type	Quantity	Manufacturer	Date	LNER Class	Notes
	Y65	2-4-2T	12	Stratford Works	1909–10	F7	
	G69	2-4-2T	20	Stratford Works	1911–12	F6	
	S69	4-6-0	71	Stratford Works (51); W. Beardmore & Co. (20)	1911–20	B12	Another 10 built in 1928
	E72	0-6-0	10	Stratford Works	1912	J18	Three rebuilt as T77 by GER, remainder rebuilt as J19 by LNER
	Y14	0-6-0	20	Stratford Works	1912–13	J15	Continuation of T. W. Worsdell design

== Alfred John Hill (1912–1922) ==
Image	Class	Type	Quantity	Manufacturer	Date	LNER Class	Notes
	C72	0-6-0T	20	Stratford Works	1912–14	J68	Another 10 built by the LNER in 1923
	B74	0-4-0T	5	Stratford Works	1913–20	Y4	
	L77	0-6-2T	12	Stratford Works	1915–21	N7	Another 122 built by the LNER, 1923–28
	T77	0-6-0	25	Stratford Works	1916–20	J19	
	D81	0-6-0	25	Stratford Works	1920–22	J20	

== Locomotives built to GER designs after 1922 ==
Image	GER Class	LNER Class	Type	Quantity	Manufacturer	Date	Notes
	H88	D16	4-4-0	10	Stratford Works	1923	"Super Claud"; delivered after grouping
	C72	J68	0-6-0T	10	Stratford Works	1923	Delivered after grouping
	L77	N7	0-6-2T	122	Stratford Works (10); Gorton Works (40); R. Stephenson & Co. (20); Wm. Beardmore & Co. (20); Doncaster Works (32)	1923–28	
	S69	B12	4-6-0	10	Beyer, Peacock & Co.	1928	

== Preserved locomotives ==
Image	GER No.	GER Class	Type	Manufacturer	Serial No.	Date	Notes
	229	209	0-4-0ST	Neilson and Company	2119	April; 1876	Sold 1918; returned to steam in 2025 after overhaul. Because it was withdrawn prior to grouping, it was never assigned an LNER number.
	490	T26	2-4-0	Stratford Works	836	January; 1895	BR 62785. Static exhibit, National Collection; on loan to Bressingham Steam and Gardens.
	87	S56	0-6-0T	Stratford Works	1249	September; 1904	BR 68633. Static exhibit, National Collection; on loan to Bressingham Steam and Gardens.
	1217	G58	0-6-0	Stratford Works	1270	May; 1905	BR 65567. Static exhibit, National Collection; on loan to Barrow Hill Engine Shed
	564	Y14	0-6-0	Stratford Works	1506	March; 1912	BR 65462. Owned by the Midland and Great Northern Joint Railway Society on the North Norfolk Railway.
Locomotives built to GER designs after 1922
	LNER; 7999	N7 (GER L77)	0-6-2T	Stratford Works	1702	March; 1924	BR 69621. Owned by the East Anglian Railway Museum. Under overhaul to working order, as of March 2024.
	LNER; 8572	B12 (GER S69)	4-6-0	Beyer, Peacock and Company	6488	August; 1928	BR 61572. Owned by the Midland and Great Northern Joint Railway Society and in service on the North Norfolk Railway.

In addition to these, there is another locomotive under construction as of 2024:

A replica of GER Class M15 2-4-2T No. 789 (LNER 7789, 7218/BR 67218). It is being built at Tyseley Locomotive Works in Birmingham.
