= GER Class C72 =

Class of British steam locomotives

GER Class C72 LNER Class J68
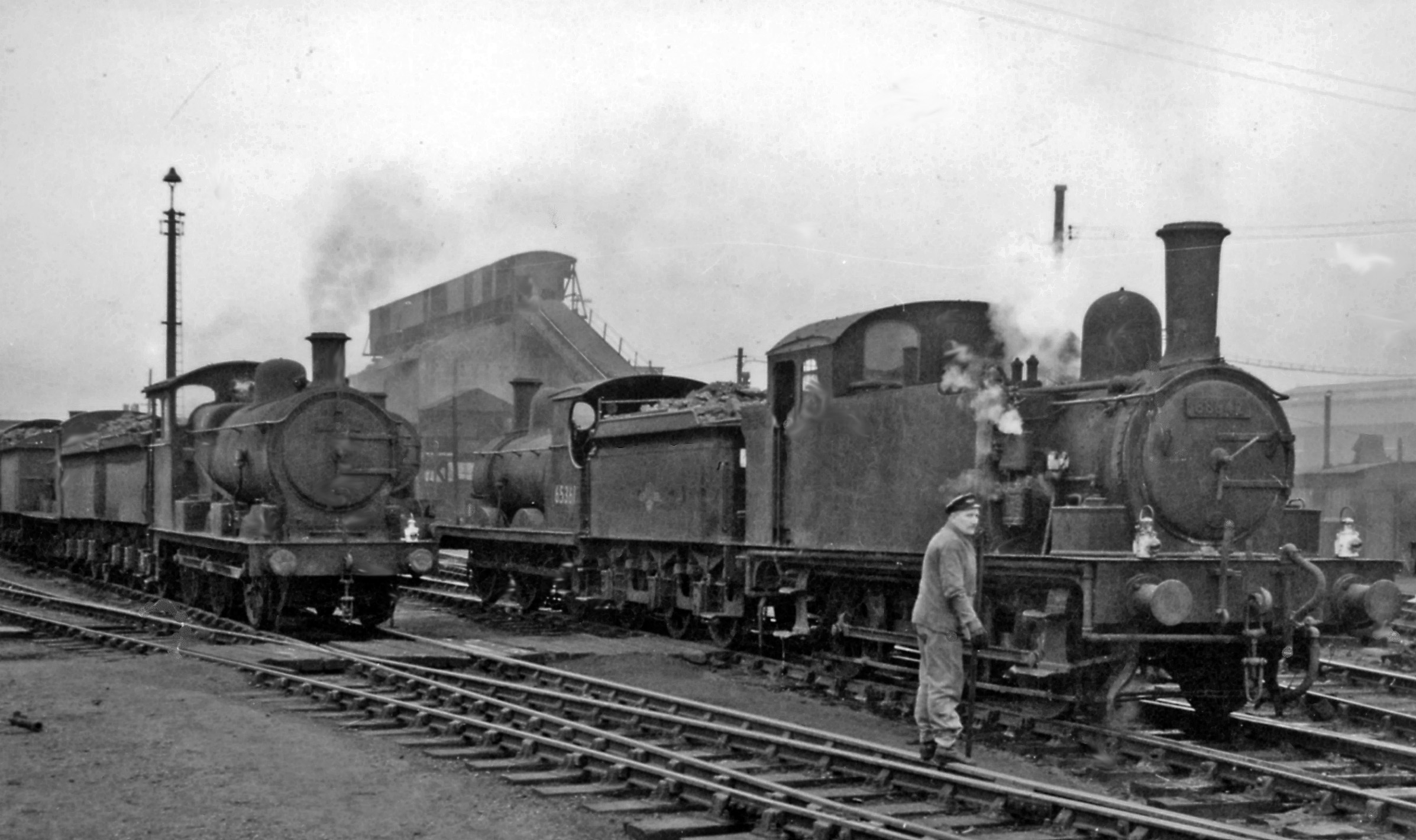
- J68 0-6-0T No. 68642 (far right) at Stratford Locomotive Depot February 1961
Type and origin
- Power type: Steam
- Designer: A. J. Hill
- Builder: Stratford Works
- Build date: 1912–1923
- Total produced: 30
Specifications
- Configuration
  - Whyte: 0-6-0T
  - UIC: C n2t
- Gauge: 4 ft 8 1/2 in (1,435 mm)
- Driver dia.: 4 ft 0 in (1.219 m)
- Wheelbase: 13 ft 10 in (4.22 m)
- Length: 27 ft 8 in (8.43 m) over buffers
- Loco weight: 42 long tons 9 cwt (95,100 lb or 43.1 t)
- Fuel type: Coal
- Fuel capacity: 2 long tons 10 cwt (5,600 lb or 2.5 t)
- Water cap.: 1,200 imp gal (5,460 L; 1,440 US gal)
- Firebox
  - Grate area: 14.5 sq ft (1.35 m^{2})
- Boiler pressure: 180 lbf/in^{2} (1.24 MPa)
- Heating surface: 996.17 sq ft (92.547 m^{2})
- Cylinders: Two, inside
- Cylinder size: 16.5 in × 22 in (419 mm × 559 mm)
Performance figures
- Tractive effort: 19,091 lbf (84.92 kN)
Career
- Operators: Great Eastern Railway; → London and North Eastern Railway; → British Railways
- Class: GER: C72; LNER: J68
- Power class: BR: 2F
- Axle load class: LNER/BR: RA 3
- Withdrawn: 1940, 1958–1961
- Disposition: All scrapped

The GER Class C72 was a class of thirty 0-6-0T steam locomotives designed by A. J. Hill for the Great Eastern Railway. They passed to the London and North Eastern Railway (LNER) at the 1923 grouping and received the LNER classification J68.

== History ==
These locomotives were an improved version of the Class S56 tanks, and the final development of James Holden's Class T18 tank locomotives, sharing the same 16.5-by-22-inch (419 mm × 559 mm) cylinders, 4-foot-0-inch (1.219 m) driving wheels, and 13-foot-10-inch (4.22 m) wheelbase. There were three orders, each of ten locomotives, all built at Stratford Works between 1912 and 1923. The first batch were built as suburban passenger tanks and were fitted with Westinghouse air brakes. The second and third batches were built as shunting tanks and were fitted with steam locomotive brakes and vacuum train brakes.

Table of orders and numbers
Year	Order	Quantity	GER Nos.	LNER Nos.	1946 Nos.	Notes
1912	C72	10	41–50	7041–7050	—, 8638–8646	Passenger service
1913–14	G75	10	21–30	7021–7030	8647–8656	Shunting service
1923	L89	10	31–40	7031–7040	8657–8666	Shunting service

The last batch did not emerge from Stratford until after the grouping.

One locomotive was lent to the War Department in October 1939, and sold 12 months later, It was used on the Longmoor Military Railway before being moved to the Bicester Central Ordnance Depot, and then the Military Port No. 1, Faslane. The remaining locomotives were renumbered 8638–8666 in order of construction. At nationalisation in 1948 they passed to British Railways, who added 60000 to their numbers. Post war withdrawals started in 1958, and all were gone by 1961.

Table of withdrawals
Year	Quantity in service at start of year	Quantity withdrawn	Locomotive numbers	Notes
1940	30	1	7041	to WD 85
1958	29	6	68651/53/59/62/64/66	
1959	23	5	68638–40/48/58	
1960	18	10	68641/43/45/52/54–57/61/65	
1961	8	8	68642/44/46–47/49–50/60/63	
