= GER Class R24 =

Class of British steam locomotives (1890–1901)

GER Class R24 LNER Class J67
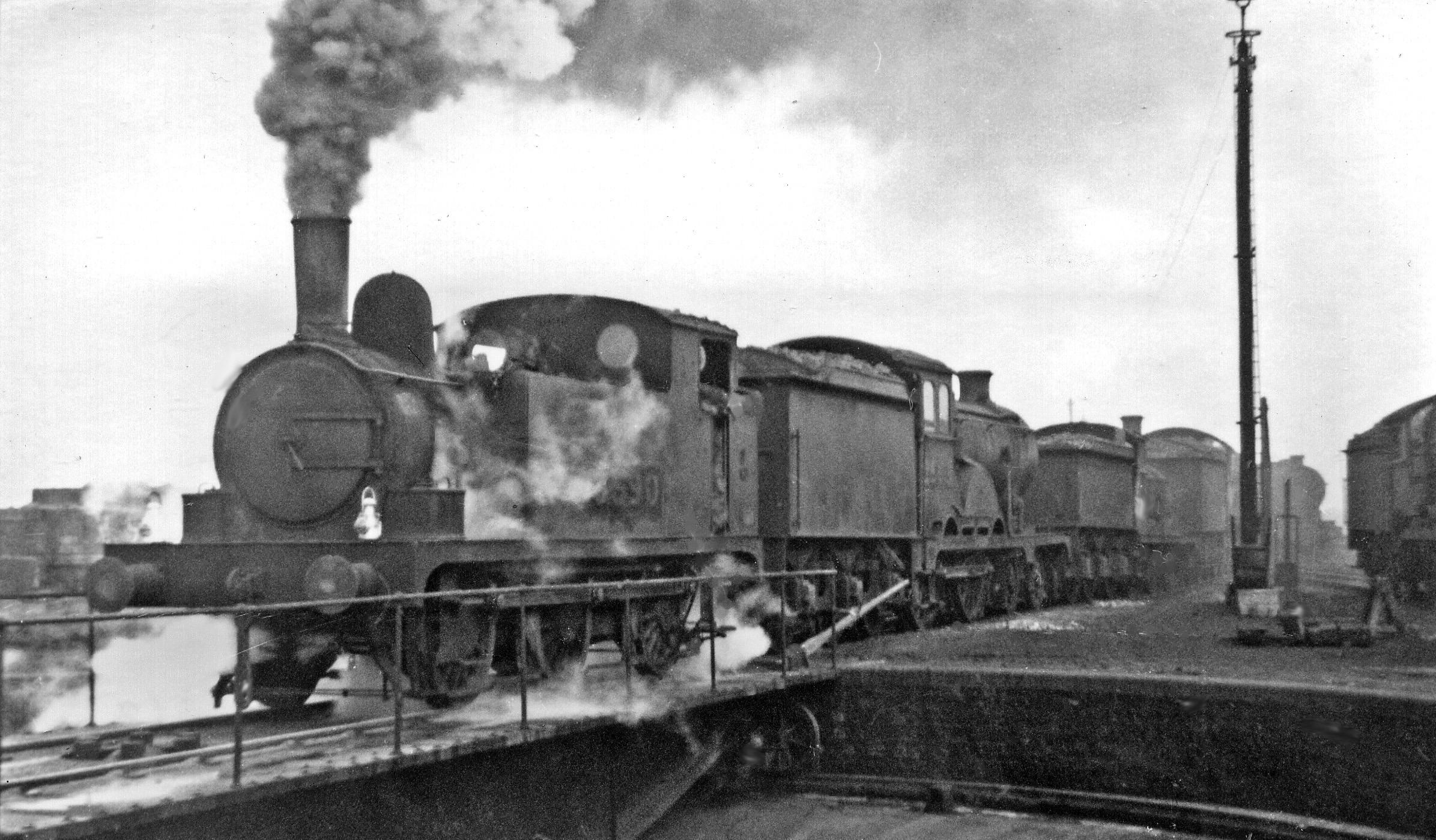
- On a foggy January Saturday, 18 January 1947, Holden J67 0-6-0T No. 8590 of 1899, is struggling across a turntable with a string of dead locomotives (D15 'Claud' 4-4-0 No. 2509, J15 0-6-0 No. 5374 and D16/3 'Super Claud' 4-4-0 No. 2608).
Type and origin
- Power type: Steam
- Designer: James Holden
- Builder: Stratford Works
- Build date: 1890–1901
- Total produced: 140
Specifications
- Configuration
  - Whyte: 0-6-0T
  - UIC: C n2t
- Gauge: 4 ft 8 1/2 in (1,435 mm)
- Driver dia.: 4 ft 0 in (1.219 m)
- Wheelbase: 13 ft 10 in (4.22 m)
- Length: 27 ft 8 in (8.43 m) over buffers
- Loco weight: 40 long tons 0 cwt (89,600 lb or 40.6 t)
- Fuel type: Coal
- Fuel capacity: 2 long tons 5 cwt (5,000 lb or 2.3 t)
- Water cap.: 1,000 imp gal (4,550 L; 1,200 US gal)
- Firebox
  - Grate area: 12.4 sq ft (1.15 m^{2})
- Boiler pressure: 160 psi (1.10 MPa)
- Heating surface: 987.4 sq ft (91.73 m^{2})
- Cylinders: Two, inside
- Cylinder size: 16 1/2 in × 22 in (419 mm × 559 mm)
Performance figures
- Tractive effort: 16,970 lbf (75.49 kN)
Career
- Operators: GER » LNER » BR
- Class: GER: R24; LNER: J67
- Power class: BR: 2F
- Axle load class: LNER/BR: RA 3
- Disposition: 51 rebuilt to R24R, remainder withdrawn 1937–1961

The GER Class R24 was a class of 0-6-0T steams designed by James Holden for the Great Eastern Railway (GER). They passed to the London and North Eastern Railway at the grouping in 1923 and received the LNER classification J67. Some R24s were rebuilt with higher boiler pressure in which form they were similar to the later Class S56. The rebuilt R24s, together with the S56s, were classified J69 by the LNER. The later Class C72, an improvement on the class S56, were classified as J68 by the LNER.

== History ==
These locomotives were very similar to the Class T18 locomotives, sharing the same dimensions for most major components. They were all built at the GER's Stratford Works between 1890 and 1901.

Table of orders and numbers
Year	Order No.	Quantity	GER Nos.	LNER No.	LNER 1946 No.	Notes
1890	R24	10	327–336	7327–7336	8490–8495, —, 8496–8498	
1890	S24	10	337–346	7337–7346	8499–8505, —, 8507–8508	
1890	A26	10	397–406	7397–7406	8509–8513, —, 8514, — 8515, —	
1890–91	B26	10	407–416	7011–7020	8516–8521, —, 8522–8523, —	Renumbered 11–20 in January 1920
1892	P29	10	347–356	7347–7356	8524–8533	
1892	R29	10	357–366	7357–7366	8534–8538, — 8540, — 8541–8542	
1894	N33	10	367–376	7367–7376	8543–8552	
1895	F36	10	377–386	7377–7386	8553–8562	
1895–96	Y36	10	387–396	7387–7396	8563, —, 8565–8572	
1896	C37	10	265–274	7265–7274	8573–8579, — 8581, —	
1899	H45	10	255–264	7255–7264	—, 8583–8585, —, 8586–8590	
1899–1900	G47	10	199–208	7199–7208	—, 8606, —, —, 8591–8592, —, 8593–8595	
1900	S48	10	189–198	7305, 7190–7198	8596–8603, —, 8605	189 renumbered 305 in January 1909
1901	R50	10	160–169	7160–7169	8607–8613, —, —, 8616	

Eighty-nine locomotives were rebuilt between 1904 and 1921 with 180-pound-force-per-square-inch (1.24 MPa) boilers and increased water capacity. Most were fitted with air brakes and used in suburban and branch line passenger service alongside the Class S56. The 51 locomotives not rebuilt were used for shunting and working local goods trains.

== Withdrawal ==
The first withdrawal was in 1931 due to accident damage. Eleven were withdrawn in 1937, and one in 1939. Thirteen class J69 locomotives were lent to the War Department in October 1939, of which eight had been built as Class R24. They were sold to the War Department in October 1940, where they were used on the Melbourne and Longmoor Military Railways. The remaining locomotives were renumbered 8490–8616 in order of construction (with one exception); however gaps were left where the locomotives sold to the War Department would have been. At nationalisation in 1948, they all passed to British Railways, who added 60000 to their number. Post-war withdrawals started in 1953, and by 1962 all had been retired.

Table of withdrawals
Year	Quantity in service at start of year	Quantity withdrawn	Locomotive numbers	Notes
1931	140	1	7364	Accident damage
1937	139	11	7017, 7020, 7199, 7201, 7202, 7205, 7255, 7259, 7402, 7404, 7406	
1939	128	1	7333	
1940	127	8	7274, 7272, 7197, 7168, 7388, 7344, 7362, 7167	to WD 78–79, 81–82, 84, 88–90 respectively
1953	119	4	68505/25/33/48	
1954	115	4	68493/509/34/72	
1955	111	11		
1956	100	13		
1957	87	9		
1958	78	22		
1959	56	18		
1960	38	12		
1961	26	18		
1962	8	8		
