= S44 =

S44 may refer to:

== Transport ==
- S44 (New York City bus), serving Staten Island, United States
- S44 (St. Gallen S-Bahn), a railway service in Switzerland
- S44, a line of the Lucerne S-Bahn in Switzerland
- GER Class S44, a British steam locomotive
- New Jersey Route 324, designated Route S44 until 1953

== Navy ==
- INS Shishumar (S44), a submarine of the Indian Navy
- USS S-44 (SS-155), a submarine of the United States Navy

== Other uses ==
- Sulfur-44, an isotope of sulfur
- S44, a postcode district in Chesterfield, England
