= E22 =

E22 may refer to:

- European route E22, a road extending from the United Kingdom to Russia
- GER Class E22, a British 0-6-0 steam tank locomotive class
- Etchells, a 22-foot sailboat
- Nimzo-Indian Defence, Encyclopaedia of Chess Openings code
- E22, a numbers station that was later discovered to simply be a repeated test broadcast run by All India Radio
- Senai–Desaru Expressway, route E22 in Malaysia
