= P43 =

P43, P-43 or P.43 may refer to:

== Aviation ==
- Paratech P43, a Swiss paraglider
- PZL.43, a Polish light bomber and reconnaissance aircraft
- Republic P-43 Lancer, a fighter aircraft of the United States Army Air Corps

== Vessels ==
- ARA Spiro (P-43), a corvette of the Argentine Navy
- HMS Unison (P43), a submarine of the Royal Navy
- Spanish patrol vessel Relámpago (P-43)

== Other uses ==
- Carro Armato P.43, an Italian heavy tank
- GER Class P43, a steam tender locomotive
- P43 route (Belarus), a road connecting to A130 highway (Russia)
- Papyrus 43, a biblical manuscript
- Phosphorus-43, an isotope of phosphorus
- P43, a Latvian state regional road
- P4_{3}, three-dimensional space group number 78
