= Robert Sinclair (locomotive engineer) =

- Born: 1 July 1817; London, England
- Died: 20 October 1898 (aged 81); Italy
- Education: Charterhouse School
- Engineering career
- Discipline: Mechanical engineering

Robert Sinclair (1 July 1817 – 20 October 1898) was the Locomotive Superintendent of several British railway companies including the Caledonian Railway and the Great Eastern Railway. He also worked for railways in France, Luxembourg and India.

He was born in London and retired to Italy where he died.

== Career ==
=== Early years ===
He was apprenticed to a shipbuilder and later worked for Robert Stephenson, the Grand Junction Railway and the Paris and Rouen Railway.

=== Chief mechanical engineer ===
He was Chief Mechanical Engineer of the Caledonian Railway (CR) from 1847–1856, the Eastern Counties Railway (ECR) from 1856–1862 and, following a merger of railways, of the Great Eastern Railway (GER) from 1862–1865.

=== Consulting engineer ===
Sinclair resigned from the GER 1865, and became a consulting engineer. In this capacity, he designed a fast 2-4-2 locomotive for the Great Luxemburg Railway, and an outside cylinder 2-4-0 for the East Indian Railway. The Luxembourg 2-4-2 design was later adapted into a 2-4-2T for commuter services on the GER.

== Locomotive designs ==
- Caledonian, see Locomotives of the Caledonian Railway
- ECR/GER, see Locomotives of the Great Eastern Railway

== Innovations ==
Sinclair was an early user of:

- the Giffard injector
- the use of steel for railway axles and wheel tyres
- roller bearings for carriages

Business positions
Preceded by (First loco engineer)	Locomotive Superintendent of the Caledonian Railway; 1847–1856	Succeeded by Benjamin Connor
Preceded by John Viret Gooch	Locomotive Superintendent of the Eastern Counties Railway; 1856–1862	Post abolished Company merged into the Great Eastern Railway
Preceded by (First loco engineer)	Locomotive Superintendent of the Great Eastern Railway; 1862–1865	Succeeded by Samuel Waite Johnson
