= GER Class C32 =

Class of British steam locomotives (1892–1902)

GER Class C32 LNER Class F3
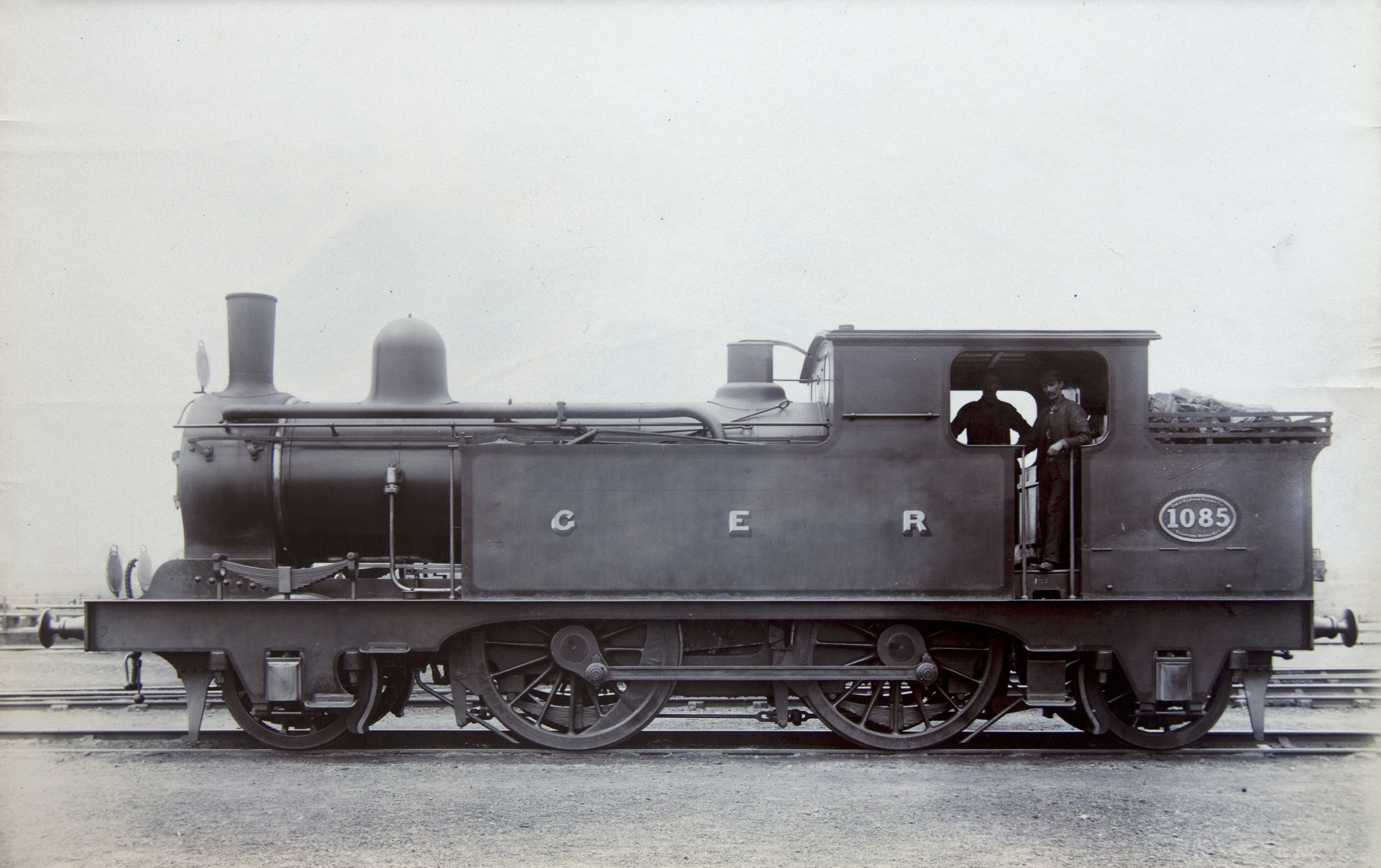
- GER 1085, one of the condenser-fitted R33 batch in an undated photograph
Type and origin
- Power type: Steam
- Designer: James Holden
- Builder: Stratford Works
- Build date: 1893–1895 (40), 1902 (10)
- Total produced: 50
Specifications
- Configuration
  - Whyte: 2-4-2T
  - UIC: 1B1 n2t
- Gauge: 4 ft 8 1/2 in (1,435 mm)
- Leading dia.: 4 ft 0 in (1.219 m)
- Driver dia.: 5 ft 8 in (1.727 m)
- Trailing dia.: 4 ft 0 in (1.219 m)
- Length: 34 ft 10 in (10.62 m) over buffers
- Axle load: 15.30 long tons (15.55 t)
- Adhesive weight: 29.25 long tons (29.72 t)
- Loco weight: 58.60 long tons (59.54 t)
- Fuel capacity: 3.25 long tons (3.30 t)
- Water cap.: 1,460 imp gal (6,600 L; 1,750 US gal)
- Firebox
  - Grate area: 18.0 sq ft (1.67 m^{2})
- Boiler pressure: 160 lbf/in^{2} (1.10 MPa)
- Heating surface
  - Firebox: 100.9 sq ft (9.37 m^{2})
  - Tubes: 1,063.8 sq ft (98.83 m^{2})
  - Total surface: 1,164.7 sq ft (108.20 m^{2})
- Cylinders: Two, inside
- Cylinder size: 17 1/2 in × 24 in (444 mm × 610 mm)
- Valve gear: Stephenson
- Valve type: Slide valves
- Loco brake: Westinghouse air
- Train brakes: Westinghouse air
Performance figures
- Tractive effort: 14,700 lbf (65.39 kN)
Career
- Operators: Great Eastern Railway; → London and North Eastern Railway; → British Railways
- Class: GER: 32; LNER: F3
- Power class: BR: 1P
- Axle load class: LNER: Route availability 3
- Withdrawn: 1936–1953
- Disposition: All scrapped

The GER Class C32 was a class of fifty 2-4-2T steam locomotives designed by James Holden and built by the company's Stratford Works between 1892 and 1902. They all passed to the London and North Eastern Railway at the 1923 grouping and received the classification F3.

== History ==
These locomotives were fitted with 17 1/2-by-24-inch (444 mm × 610 mm) cylinders and 5-foot-8-inch (1.727 m) diameter driving wheels. They were a tank engine version of the T26 class 2-4-0s, albeit with a 3-inch (76 mm) shorter coupled wheelbase. They shared the same type of boiler as that class, as well as the N31 and later Y14 class 0-6-0s. They were intended for use on long-distance stopping services, and so they were all initially fitted with Westinghouse air brake equipment.

Table of orders and numbers
Year	Order	Builder	Quantity	GER Nos.	LNER Nos.	1946 No.	Notes
1893	C32	Stratford Works	10	1090–1099	8090–8099	7114–710	
1893	O33	Stratford Works	10	1070–1079	8070–8079	7121–7127	
1894	R33	Stratford Works	10	1080–1089	8080–8089	7128–7132	
1895	G35	Stratford Works	10	1060–1069	8060–8069	7133–7140	
1902	D53	Stratford Works	10	1040–1049	8040–8049	7141–7150	

The R33 and D53 batches had been fitted with condensing equipment from new, but the LNER gradually removed them from all but one locomotive, the exception being an early retirement.

All had survived to pass to the LNER in 1923; the first retirement started in 1936 when 8090 was withdrawn.

Thirty-seven locomotives lasted long enough to be renumbered in the 1946 scheme; fifteen of them became the property of British Railways in 1948, but only three of them lasted long enough to receive their BR number.

Table of withdrawals
Year	Quantity in service at start of year	Quantity withdrawn	Locomotive numbers
1936	50	1	8090
1937	49	4	8069, 8074, 8076, 8098
1938	45	8	8065, 8073, 8080, 8083, 8084, 8086, 8087, 8091
1947	37	22	7116/18/21–23/25/29–33/35–38/42/44–48 (ex-8094/96/99/70–73/77/82/85/88/89/60/62–64/66/41/43–47)
1948	15	7	7114, 7115, 7117, 7119, 7134, 7141, 7143 (ex-8092, 8093, 8095, 8097, 8061, 8040, 8042)
1949	8	3	7140, 67149, 7150 (ex-8068, 8048, 8049)
1950	5	4	7124, 7126, 67128, 7139 (ex-8075, 8078, 8081, 8067)
1953	1	1	67127 (ex-1079)

== Further material ==
- "LNER Class F3 encyclopaedia entry". LNER Encyclopedia.
