= GER 552 Class =

Class of GER 0-6-0 steam locomotives

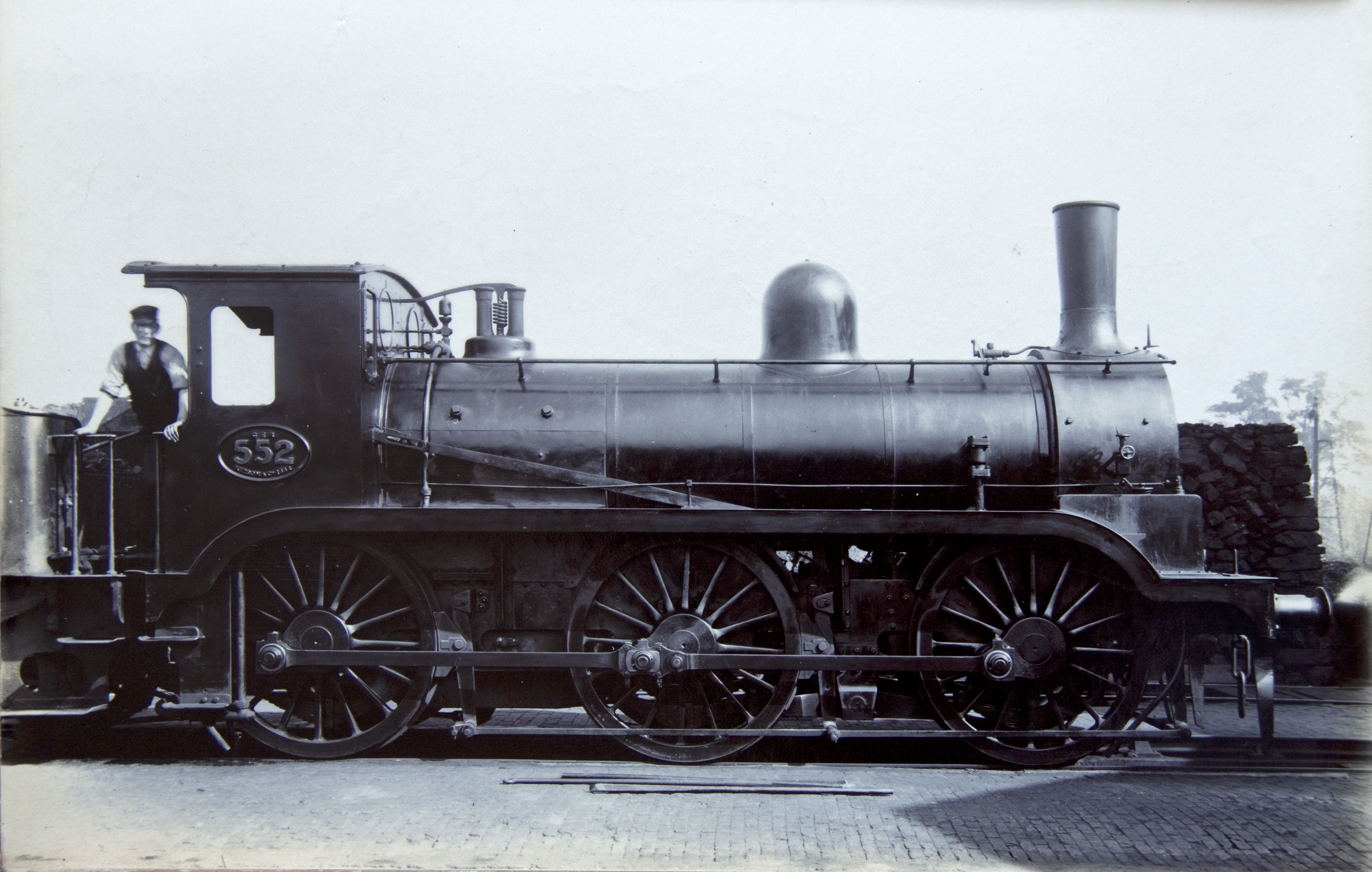
Type and origin
- Power type: Steam
- Designer: Massey Bromley
- Builder: Kitson and Company
- Build date: 1882
- Total produced: 10
Specifications
- Configuration
  - Whyte: 0-6-0
- Gauge: 1,435 mm (4 ft 8 1/2 in) standard gauge
- Leading dia.: 0
- Driver dia.: 5 ft 2 in (1.575 m)
- Trailing dia.: 0
Career
- Operators: Great Eastern Railway
- Numbers: 552-561
- Withdrawn: 1904–1906
- Disposition: All scrapped

The GER 552 Class was a class of ten 0-6-0 tender locomotives built by Kitson and Company for the Great Eastern Railway in 1882.

== History ==
The 552 Class was unusual in having their footplate raised clear of the driving wheels, leaving them exposed. T. W. Worsdell replaced Massey Bromley as Locomotive Superintendent at the same time as the class was being built, and he produced his own 0-6-0 design with the Y14 class. Those had larger boilers and smaller driving wheels, giving a higher tractive effort.

Under James Holden, the 552 Class were given larger cylinders and newer boilers. By this time they were mostly relegated to ballast train duties. The entire class was withdrawn and scrapped between 1904 and 1906.
