= GER Class D27 =

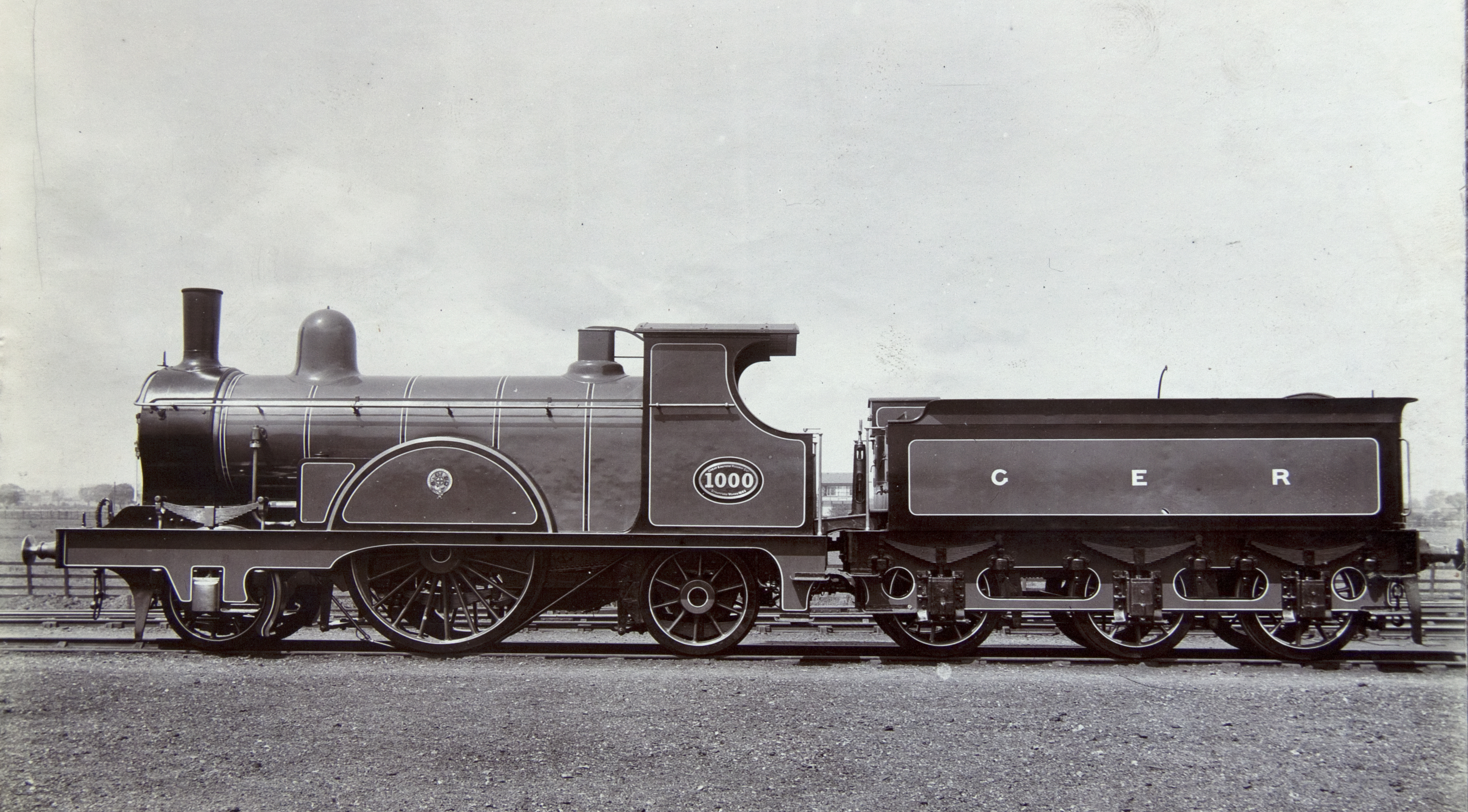
- GER 1000, the first of the 1893 batch
Type and origin
- Power type: Steam
- Designer: James Holden
- Builder: Stratford Works
- Build date: 1889–1893
- Total produced: 21
Specifications
- Configuration
  - Whyte: 2-2-2
  - UIC: 1A1 n2
- Gauge: 4 ft 8 1/2 in (1,435 mm)
- Leading dia.: 4 ft 0 in (1.219 m)
- Driver dia.: 7 ft 0 in (2.134 m)
- Trailing dia.: 4 ft 0 in (1.219 m)
- Wheelbase: 36 ft 7 in (11.15 m)
- Length: 48 ft 2 in (14.68 m) over buffers
- Adhesive weight: 17 long tons 10 cwt (39,200 lb or 17.8 t)
- Loco weight: 40 long tons 3.5 cwt (90,000 lb or 40.8 t)
- Fuel type: Coal, some fuel oil
- Firebox
  - Grate area: 18.0 sq ft (1.67 m^{2})
- Boiler pressure: 140 lbf/in^{2} (965 kPa) later 160 lbf/in^{2} (1,103 kPa)
- Heating surface: 1,199.5 sq ft (111.44 m^{2})
- Cylinders: Two, inside
- Cylinder size: 18 in × 24 in (460 mm × 610 mm)
Performance figures
- Tractive effort: 11,016 lbf (49.00 kN), later 13,114 lbf (58.33 kN)
Career
- Operators: Great Eastern Railway
- Class: D27
- Withdrawn: 1901–1907
- Disposition: All scrapped

The GER Class D27 was a class of 2-2-2 steam tender locomotives designed by James Holden for the Great Eastern Railway.

== History ==
In 1888, Holden experimented by removing the side rods of T19 No. 721 to form a 2-2-2. In 1889 the first of a new class appeared: initially No. 740 (later 789 and 780) which had been built on a 'Locomotive and Machinery' account. This was followed by two batches of ten on the more normal 'Letter' account. in 1893. They were built with 18 in × 24 in (457 mm × 610 mm) inside cylinders powered by a 140 lbf/in^{2} (965 kPa) boiler. They were later rebuilt with 18 in × 25 in (457 mm × 635 mm) and 160 lbf/in^{2} (1,103 kPa) boilers.

Table of orders and numbers
Year	Order no.	Manufacturer	Quantity	GER Nos.	Notes
1889	LM68	Stratford Works	1	740	Renumbered 789, then 780
1891	D27	Stratford Works	10	770–779	
1893	F32	Stratford Works	10	1000–1009	

One of their main spheres was on the Joint Line working expresses to York. In 1896 the class inaugurated the epic making non-stop run to North Walsham using oil-firing. Rous-Martin found that the singles climbed Brentwood Bank more rapidly than the 2-4-0s. See also Ahrons (1951).

Nine locomotives were withdrawn between 1901 and 1903. The surviving eight locomotives in the 770-series were transferred to the duplicate list in July 1904, and had their number prefixed with a "0". The remaining fourteen were withdrawn between 1904 and 1907.

Table of withdrawals
Year	Quantity in service at start of year	Quantity withdrawn	Locomotive numbers
1901	21	4	1000, 1002, 1005, 1007
1902	17	3	773, 1001, 1003
1903	14	2	1008, 1009
1904	12	4	775, 0771, 1004, 1006
1905	8	4	0772, 0774, 0777, 0780
1906	4	1	0770
1907	3	3	0776, 0778, 0779
