= GER Class E22 =

Class of British steam locomotives

GER Class E22 LNER Class J65
Type and origin
- Power type: Steam
- Designer: James Holden
- Build date: 1888–1893
- Total produced: 20
- Rebuild date: 1889–1912
Specifications
- Configuration
  - Whyte: 0-6-0T
  - UIC: C n2t
- Gauge: 4 ft 8 1/2 in (1,435 mm)
- Driver dia.: 4 ft 0 in (1.219 m)
- Wheelbase: 13 ft 4 in (4.06 m)
- Length: 27 ft 2 in (8.28 m) over buffers
- Loco weight: 36 long tons 10.5 cwt (81,800 lb or 37.1 t)
- Fuel type: Coal
- Fuel capacity: 2 long tons 10 cwt (5,600 lb or 2.5 t)
- Water cap.: 650 imp gal (2,950 L; 781 US gal)
- Firebox
  - Grate area: 12.4 sq ft (1.15 m^{2})
- Boiler pressure: 160 psi (1.10 MPa)
- Heating surface: 979.4 sq ft (90.99 m^{2})
- Cylinder size: 14 in × 20 in (356 mm × 508 mm)
Performance figures
- Tractive effort: 11,106 lbf (49.40 kN)
Career
- Operators: GER » LNER » BR
- Class: GER: E22; LNER: J65
- Power class: BR: 1F
- Nicknames: Blackwall Tanks
- Axle load class: LNER/BR: RA 1
- Withdrawn: 1930–1956
- Disposition: All scrapped

The GER Class E22 was a class of twenty 0-6-0T steam locomotives designed by James Holden for the Great Eastern Railway. They passed to the London and North Eastern Railway at the grouping in 1923 and received the LNER classification J65.

== History ==
These had 4-foot-0-inch (1.219 m) coupled wheels, 14-by-20-inch (356 by 508 mm) cylinders and were lighter than the T18 (LNER J66) class.

Table of orders and numbers
Year	Order	Builder	Quantity	GER Nos.	LNER Nos.	Notes
1889	E22	Stratford Works	10	150–159	7150–7159	
1893	B32	Stratford Works	10	245–254	7245–7254	

They were reboilered between 1889 and 1912. The Macallan variable blastpipe was removed from 1924. They ran as 2-4-0Ts on the Fenchurch Street to Blackwall service and were sometimes known as Blackwall Tanks. They operated on the Stoke Ferry, Eye and Mid-Suffolk Light Railway branches. Withdrawals started in 1930, and by 1937 fifteen had been withdrawn, but there were no more retirements for ten years. In 1944 the five surviving locomotives were renumbered 8211–8215 in order of construction. These last five were withdrawn between 1947 and 1956, when the class became extinct.

Table of withdrawals
Year	Quantity in service at start of year	Quantity withdrawn	Locomotive numbers
1930	20	1	7246
1931	19	3	7153, 7245, 7251
1932	16	2	7154, 7158
1935	14	2	7152, 7252
1936	12	1	7248
1937	11	6	7150, 7151, 7156, 7159, 7249, 7254
1947	5	1	8212 (ex-7157)
1948	4	1	68213 (ex-7247)
1949	3	1	68215 (ex-7253)
1953	2	1	68211 (ex-7155)
1956	1	1	68214 (ex-7250)
