= GER Class T19 =

Class of British 2-4-0 steam locomotives

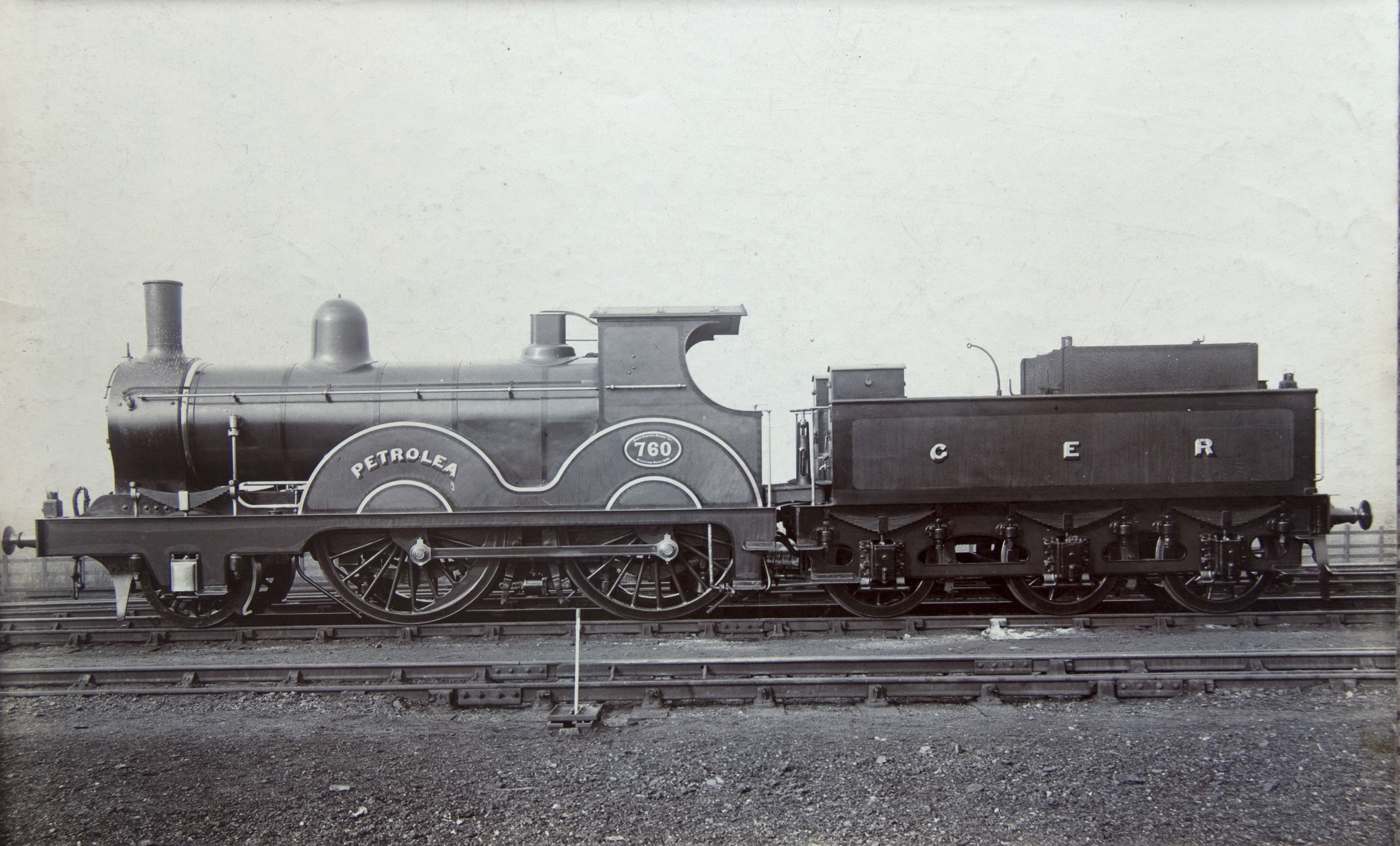
- Oil-burning T19 No. 760 Petrolea
Type and origin
- Power type: Steam
- Designer: James Holden
- Builder: Stratford Works
- Build date: 1886-1897
- Total produced: 110
Specifications
- Configuration
  - Whyte: 2-4-0
  - UIC: 1B n2
- Gauge: 4 ft 8 1/2 in (1,435 mm)
- Leading dia.: 4 ft 0 in (1.219 m)
- Driver dia.: 7 ft 0 in (2.134 m)
- Wheelbase: 36 ft 7 in (11.15 m)
- Length: 48 ft 2 in (14.68 m) over buffers
- Adhesive weight: 27 long tons 11 cwt (61,700 lb or 28 t)
- Loco weight: 42 long tons 0 cwt (94,100 lb or 42.7 t)
- Fuel type: Coal, some converted to fuel oil
- Firebox
  - Grate area: 18 sq ft (1.7 m^{2})
- Boiler pressure: 160 lbf/in^{2} (1.10 MPa)
- Heating surface: 1,199.5 sq ft (111.44 m^{2})
- Cylinders: Two, inside
- Cylinder size: 18 in × 24 in (457 mm × 610 mm)
Performance figures
- Tractive effort: 12,590 lbf (56.00 kN)
Career
- Operators: Great Eastern Railway
- Nicknames: Standards
- Withdrawn: 1902–1908 (for rebuilding); 1908–1913 (for scrapping)
- Disposition: 29 scrapped, 21 rebuilt as "Humpty-Dumpties", 60 rebuilt as 4-4-0

The GER Class T19 was a class of 2-4-0 steam tender locomotives designed by James Holden for the Great Eastern Railway. Some were later rebuilt with larger boilers while others were rebuilt with both larger boilers and a 4-4-0 wheel arrangement. Unusually, both the 2-4-0 and 4-4-0 rebuilds were classified as GER Class T19 Rebuilt. All the 2-4-0s had been withdrawn by 1920 so only the 4-4-0s passed to the London and North Eastern Railway in 1923 and these became the LNER Class D13.

== Standard 2-4-0s ==
The T19s was similar to the Worsdell Class G14, but had a slightly larger boiler. One hundred and ten locomotives were constructed. They had 18-by-24-inch (457 mm × 610 mm) cylinders and the last ten had 160-pound-force-per-square-inch (1.10 MPa) boilers, but the remainder were gradually fitted with two-ring boilers.

Table of orders and numbers
Year	Order No.	Builder	Quantity	GER Nos.	Notes
1886–87	T19	Stratford Works	10	710–719	
1888	S20	Stratford Works	10	720–729	
1888	F21	Stratford Works	10	730–739	
1889	O22	Stratford Works	10	740–749	
1889	R22	Stratford Works	10	750–759	
1890	T24	Stratford Works	10	760–769	
1892	S29	Stratford Works	10	700–709	
1892	V29	Stratford Works	10	781–790	renumbered 770–779 in July 1904
1893	D32	Stratford Works	10	1010–1019	
1895	H35	Stratford Works	10	1020–1029	
1897	M39	Stratford Works	10	1030–1039	

No. 758 was fitted with an extended smokebox in 1900. Oil burning apparatus was fitted to No. 712 and 759–767. No. 760 was named Petrolea. Tenders with water scoops were fitted to Nos. 762–767 and 1030–1039 to enable the Cromer expresses to run non-stop from Liverpool Street to North Walsham from 1 July 1897. Water troughs were installed near Tivetshall in 1896, and at Halifax Junction (just south of Ipswich) in 1897.

=== Royal trains ===
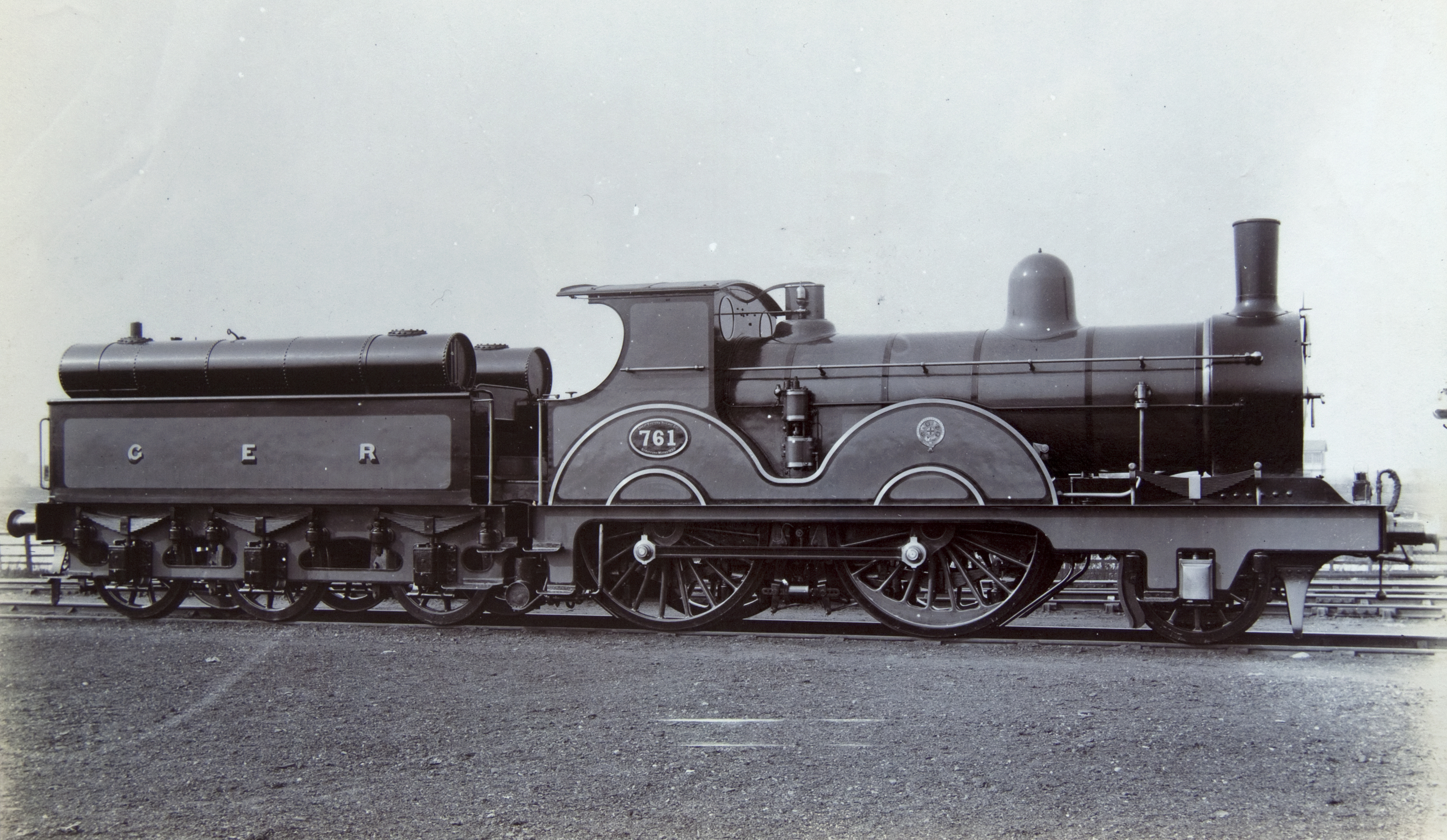
Oil-burning T19 No. 761, one of the class frequently used for powering Royal trains. It was not rebuilt, being withdrawn in 1908.

No. 755 hauled the funeral train for the late Prince Albert Victor, Duke of Clarence and Avondale from King's Lynn to Windsor on 28 January 1892. No. 761 hauled the honeymoon train for the late prince's brother and former fiancée the Duke and Duchess of York (later George V and Queen Mary) from Liverpool Street to King's Lynn on 6 July 1893.

81 were rebuilt at the beginning of the 20th century. The remaining 29 were scrapped between 1908 and 1913.

Table of withdrawals
Year	Quantity in service at start of year	Quantity withdrawn	Locomotive Numbers
1908	29	8	711, 723, 746, 749, 754, 758, 761, 1024
1909	21	10	714, 716, 720–722, 753, 701, 703, 773, 1038
1910	11	7	726, 736, 752, 755, 757, 709, 1019
1911	4	3	740, 759, 764
1913	1	1	768

== "Humpty Dumpty" 2-4-0s ==
GER Class T19R "Humpty Dumpty"
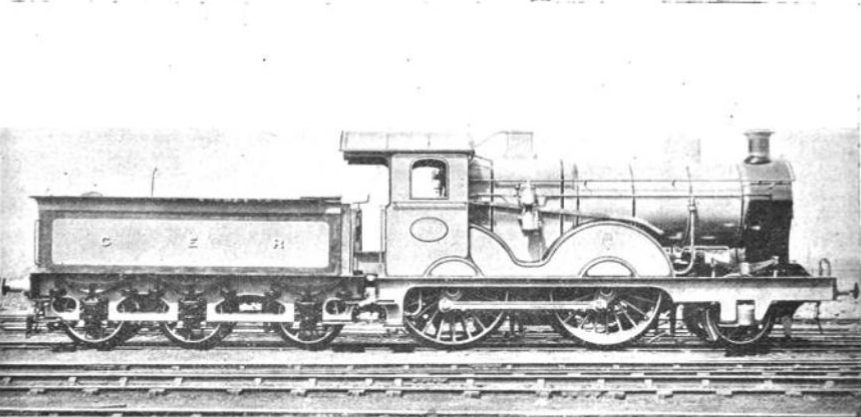
- GER 769
Type and origin
- Only differences from T19 above are shown
- Power type: Steam
- Rebuilder: Stratford Works
- Rebuild date: 1902–1904
- Number rebuilt: 21
Specifications
- Adhesive weight: 30 long tons 12 cwt (68,500 lb or 31.1 t)
- Loco weight: 45 long tons 9 cwt (101,800 lb or 46.2 t)
- Firebox
  - Grate area: 21.6 sq ft (2.01 m^{2})
- Boiler: Belpaire
- Boiler pressure: 180 lbf/in^{2} (1.24 MPa)
- Heating surface: 1,476.2 sq ft (137.14 m^{2})
Performance figures
- Tractive effort: 14,162 lbf (63.00 kN)
Career
- Operators: Great Eastern Railway
- Class: T19R
- Nicknames: Humpty Dumpty
- Withdrawn: 1913–1920

Between 1902 and 1904, twenty-nine were rebuilt with new boilers with Belpaire fireboxes. With their small tenders, and a dome well-forward on the first ring, they looked front-heavy, and gained the nickname Humpty Dumpties. In fact they were so front heavy that they were never considered for superheating. They were withdrawn between 1913 and 1920.

Table of withdrawals
Year	Quantity in service at start of year	Quantity withdrawn	Locomotive Numbers
1913	21	6	743, 762, 763, 769, 1022, 1034
1914	15	5	724, 760, 770, 774, 1011
1915	10	5	727, 750, 1010, 1014, 1017
1919	5	3	725, 702, 771
1920	2	2	776, 778

== 4-4-0s ==
GER T19R 4-4-0 LNER Class D13
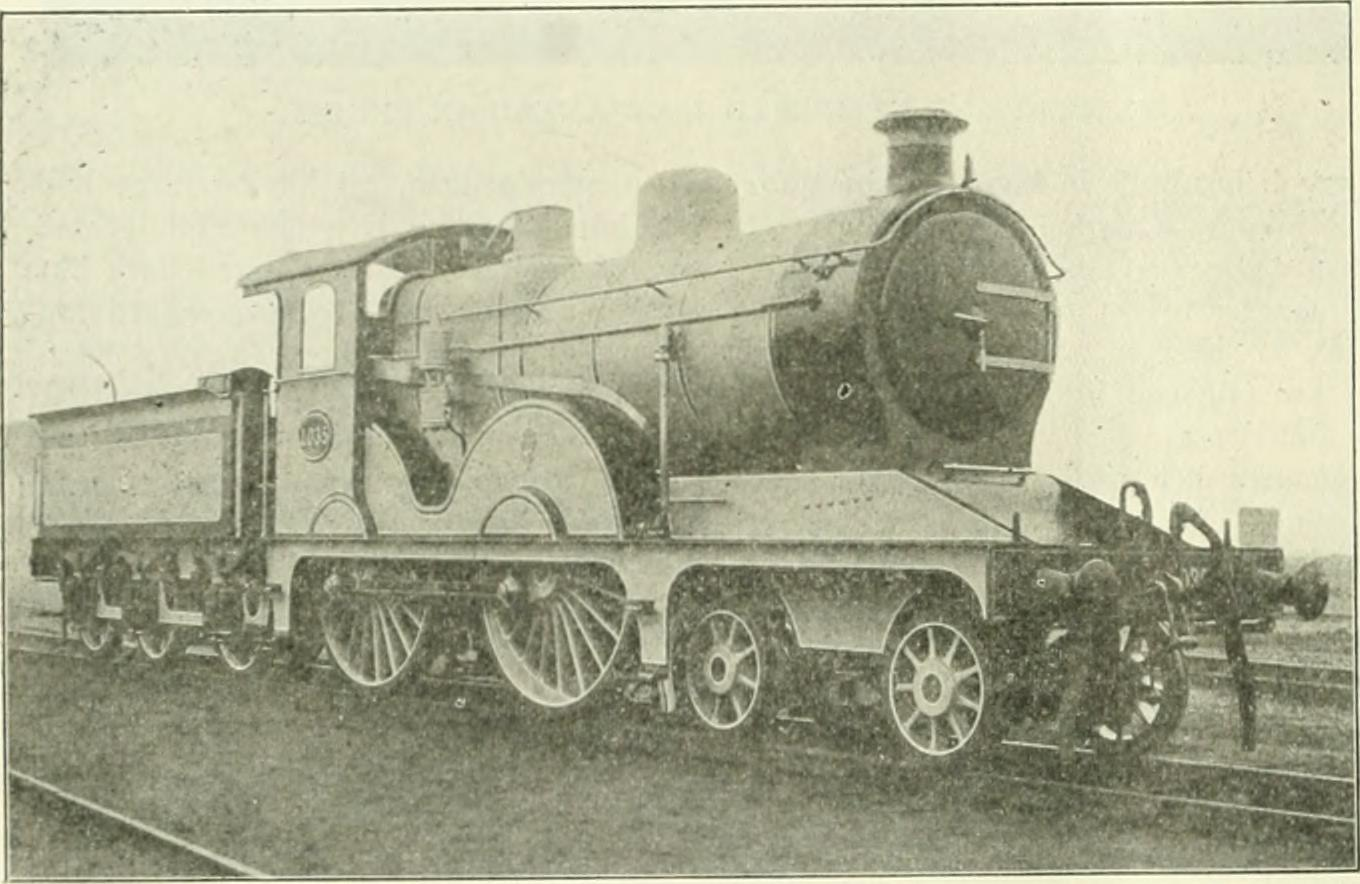
Type and origin
- Only differences from T19 above are shown
- Power type: Steam
- Rebuilder: Stratford Works
- Rebuild date: 1905–1908
- Number rebuilt: 60
Specifications
- Configuration
  - Whyte: 4-4-0
  - UIC: 2′B n2, later 2′B h2
- Leading dia.: 3 ft 1 in (0.940 m)
- Wheelbase: 41 ft 5 1/2 in (12.64 m)
- Length: 50 ft 7 1/2 in (15.43 m)
- Adhesive weight: 32 long tons 14 cwt (73,200 lb or 33.2 t)
- Loco weight: 48 long tons 6 cwt (108,200 lb or 49.1 t)
- Firebox
  - Grate area: 21.6 sq ft (2.01 m^{2})
- Boiler pressure: 180 lbf/in^{2} (1.24 MPa)
- Heating surface: 1,297.3 sq ft (120.52 m^{2})
Performance figures
- Tractive effort: 14,163 lbf (63.00 kN)
Career
- Operators: GER » LNER
- Class: GER: T19R; LNER: D13
- Withdrawn: 1922–1944

Between 1905 and 1908 sixty were rebuilt as 4-4-0 tender engines with the same new Belpaire boilers. The first ten re-used the bogies from Class G16 4-4-0s, while the other re-used the rear bogie from withdrawn Class E10 0-4-4T locomotives. Superheaters began to be fitted from 1913, and all those still in service in 1926 had been so fitted.

Two were withdrawn in 1922, and the remaining fifty-eight passed to the LNER at the 1923 grouping. The LNER Classified them as Class D13, and added 7000 to their Great Eastern number. They were initially repainted in the LNER passenger green livery, but from 1928, repaints were in black with red lining. Withdrawals continued steadily, until in 1944, the last survivor was withdrawn. See also (Ahrons 1951).

Table of withdrawals
Year	Quantity in service at start of year	Quantity withdrawn	Locomotive Numbers
1922	60	2	715, 747
1923	58	1	7730
1925	57	1	8018
1926	56	2	7705, 8031
1927	54	1	8033
1929	53	1	7710
1930	52	2	7717, 7765
1931	50	8	7712, 7728, 7731, 7733, 7734, 7738, 7739, 7748
1932	42	3	7719, 7735, 7704
1933	39	6	7713, 7718, 7732, 7737, 7745, 7751
1934	33	4	7767, 7777, 8015, 8037
1935	29	9	7741, 7742, 7744, 7766, 7700, 7708, 7779, 8012, 8013
1936	20	6	7729, 7775, 8020, 8021, 8027, 8032
1937	14	4	7707, 8025, 8026, 8036
1938	10	7	7756, 7706, 7772, 8016, 8028–8030
1943	3	2	8023, 8035
1944	1	1	8039

== See also ==
- GER Class T26
