= GER Class A55 =

Experimental steam locomotive

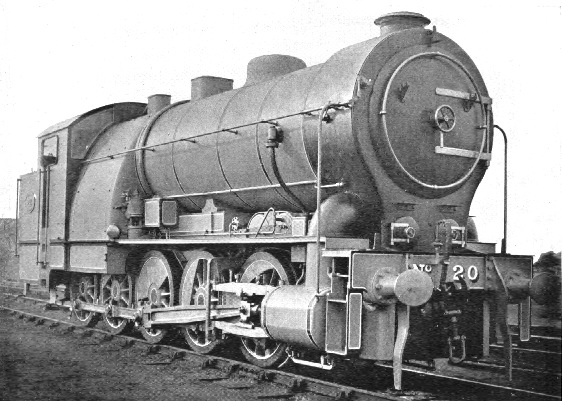
Type and origin
- Power type: Steam
- Designer: James Holden
- Builder: Stratford Works
- Order number: A55
- Build date: 1902
- Total produced: 1
- Rebuild date: 1906
Specifications
- Configuration
  - Whyte: 0-10-0WT
  - UIC: E n3tp
- Gauge: 4 ft 8 1/2 in (1,435 mm)
- Driver dia.: 4 ft 6 in (1.372 m)
- Loco weight: 80 long tons 0 cwt (179,200 lb or 81.3 t)
- Fuel capacity: 2 long tons 0 cwt (4,500 lb or 2 t)
- Water cap.: 1,300 imp gal (5,900 L; 1,600 US gal)
- Firebox
  - Grate area: 42 sq ft (3.9 m^{2})
- Boiler: Length: 15 ft 6 in (4.724 m); Inside dia: 5 ft 3 in (1.600 m)
- Heating surface
  - Firebox: 131.7 sq ft (12.24 m^{2})
  - Tubes: 395 x 1.75 in (44.5 mm) dia
  - Total surface: 2,873.3 sq ft (266.94 m^{2})
- Cylinders: Three
- Cylinder size: 18.5 in × 24 in (470 mm × 610 mm)
Performance figures
- Tractive effort: 38,788 lbf (172.54 kN)
Career
- Operators: Great Eastern Railway
- Class: A55
- Number in class: 1
- Numbers: 20
- Nicknames: Decapod
- Withdrawn: 1913
- Scrapped: 1913
- Disposition: Rebuilt in 1906 as an 0-8-0 and later scrapped in 1913

The GER Class A55 or Decapod was a one-off experimental steam locomotive with an 0-10-0WT wheel arrangement designed by James Holden for the Great Eastern Railway. It was the first ten-coupled steam locomotive in Great Britain.

== Background ==
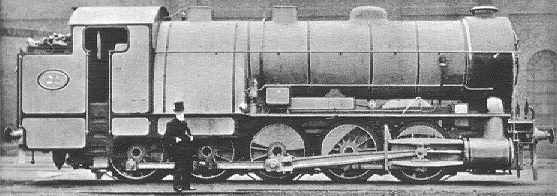
James Holden stands in front of his locomotive.

The locomotive was built for purely political purposes in order to block the passage through Parliament of a new rival scheme for an electric railway. The Decapod was built in 1902 to a design by the GER Chief Draughtsman, Fred Russell under the supervision of the Chief Superintendent, James Holden. The aim was to demonstrate the ability of a steam locomotive to accelerate passenger trains at a rate comparable to electric traction and the electric trams with which the GER was also in competition over short distances.

The locomotive was far larger than any locomotive previously built in Britain for home service. It had ten 4 ft 6 in (1,370 mm) driving wheels for maximum adhesion and high tractive effort. Three cylinders were used due to insufficient room for two larger ones without greatly increasing boiler pressure, though it still needed 200 psi (1,400 kPa) in service.

== Technical details ==
The engine was fitted with a large Wootten firebox. There were three separate grates and ash pans, one on each side outside the frames and a third between, giving an aggregate area of 42 sq ft (3.90 m^{2}). The trailing drivers were given a side play of 0.5 in (12.7 mm), the coupling rods being fitted with ball and socket joints. As the cranks of the three cylinders were set at 120 degrees in relation to each other, perfect balancing of the reciprocating parts was secured. In order to minimise the drivers slipping, compressed air sanders were fitted.

== Performance ==
The specification required that the locomotive should accelerate a 315 long tons (320 t) train from a stand to 30 miles per hour (48 km/h) in 30 seconds, an acceleration of 1.46 feet per second per second. According to Ahrons, "Holden's engine actually accelerated a new train of eighteen coaches, weighing 335 tons, at a rate of 1.4ft. per second per second in very windy weather."

Axle load at 16.75 tons (17 tonnes) was not excessive, but weight per foot run of wheelbase was very high and using a class of these engines would have necessitated considerable strengthening of bridges. Thus whilst it achieved its design aims, nothing resulted from the experiment.

== Rebuilt ==
GER Class A55R
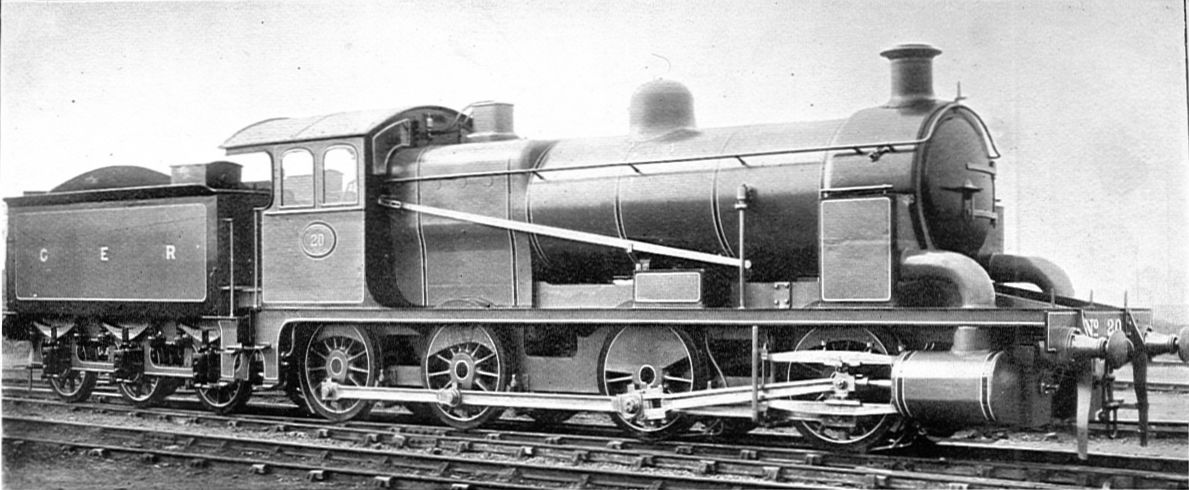
- As rebuilt to an 0-8-0
Type and origin
- Power type: Steam
- Rebuilder: Stratford Works
- Rebuild date: 1906
- Number rebuilt: 1
Specifications
- Configuration
  - Whyte: 0-8-0
  - UIC: D n2g
- Gauge: 4 ft 8 1/2 in (1,435 mm)
- Driver dia.: 4 ft 6 in (1.372 m)
- Wheelbase: 23 ft 3 in (7.09 m)
- Length: 56 ft 11 in (17.35 m) over buffers
- Loco weight: 54 long tons 6.75 cwt (121,700 lb or 55.2 t)
- Tender weight: 38 long tons 5 cwt (85,700 lb or 38.9 t)
- Total weight: 92 long tons 11.75 cwt (207,400 lb or 94.1 t)
- Boiler: Inside length: 12 ft 11 3/4 in (3.956 m); Diameter: 4 ft 9 in (1.448 m)
- Boiler pressure: 180 psi (1.24 MPa)
- Heating surface
  - Firebox: 131 sq ft (12.2 m^{2})
  - Tubes: 1,738 sq ft (161.5 m^{2})
  - Flues: 22.9 sq ft (2.1 m^{2})
  - Total surface: 1,869 sq ft (173.6 m^{2})
- Cylinders: Two, outside
- Cylinder size: 18.5 in × 24 in (470 mm × 610 mm)
Career
- Operators: Great Eastern Railway
- Numbers: 20
- Scrapped: 1913

As the locomotive was therefore surplus to requirements, it was rebuilt in 1906, and converted into an 0-8-0 freight tender engine. The rebuild included a new boiler with a Belpaire firebox and a standard GE high-sided goods locomotive tender.

Number 20 was then assigned to March district for hauling coal trains, but proved no more capable than the Class G58 locomotives. The design was therefore not repeated, and the locomotive remained the only eight-coupled engine of the GER.

It was scrapped in 1913 as nonstandard after a short working life.

== 0-10-0 developments ==
The Midland Railway produced the second 0-10-0 locomotive in 1919 with its MR 0-10-0 Lickey Banker. The third ten-coupled engine however would not appear until 1943 in the guise of a class of 2-10-0s built by the War Department, the Austerity 2-10-0. These were followed in 1954 by the last class of British ten-coupled engines, the BR Standard Class 9F.

== In fiction ==
In the 2017 film, Thomas & Friends: Journey Beyond Sodor, the character Hurricane is based on this engine before it was rebuilt.
