= Faslane Branch =

Former railway line in Scotland

Overview
- Headquarters: Faslane
- Locale: Scotland
- Dates of operation: 1941–1983

Technical
- Track gauge: 4 ft 8 1/2 in (1,435 mm)
- Length: 2 1/2 mi (4.0 km)

The Faslane Branch was a standard gauge military railway built during World War II to serve "Military Port No.1" at Faslane, west of Glasgow in Scotland.

Latterly, the branch was used to serve the ship breaking activities at Faslane.

== Route ==
The Faslane Branch diverged west from the LNER's West Highland Railway at "Faslane Junction", beyond which was a group of exchange sidings and a locomotive shed. Northwards from here, the single line crossed a bridge, then was double track all the way to Faslane Bay. Faslane Platform stood near the junction from 1945 to 1949 serving the PoW camps that supplied labour for the Loch Sloy Hydroelectric Scheme at Inveruglas.

Near the 1 milepost was the level crossing at Shandon, where the railway crossed the road leading to Shandon station on the West Highland Railway. Sprung catch points were installed in the Up (southbound) line just south of the crossing on account of the gradient which fell steeply towards Faslane.

Near the 2 milepost, there was a quarry siding on the east side of the line, and a further set of catch points in both running lines.

A little further north was Belmore Crossing, where the railway crossed the A814 road. A signal box stood just north of the crossing, on the east side of the line.

The branch line ended at Faslane Bay, where an extensive layout of sidings was provided. The furthest extremity of the branch terminated alongside a platform.

== Operation ==
Unusually for a British railway, right-hand running was in force over the double track, to familiarise the War Department personnel with the conditions that they would be likely to encounter while serving in Continental Europe.

== Rationalisation and closure ==
In April 1946, when Faslane ceased to be a military port, the running and maintenance of the branch line was taken over by the LNER, although it continued to be owned by the War Department, and subsequently the Ministry of Defence. The branch was reduced to single track on 30 May 1946, after which all trains would use the former Down (northbound) line. Catch points were installed in the single line just south of Shandon crossing.

== Signalling ==
Originally, the railway had block posts at Faslane Yard, Shandon L.C., Belmore L.C. and Faslane Bay. The points and semaphore signals at each location were worked from ground frames, with the exception of Belmore, where a signal box was built to house the lever frame (comprising 7 levers) and gate wheel. The three block sections were worked by the absolute block system.

From 1946, the single line was worked on the 'One Train Working' principle, with a train staff.
