= James Holden (locomotive engineer) =

English locomotive engineer

James Holden (26 July 1837 – 29 May 1925) was an English locomotive engineer.

He is remembered mainly for the "Claud Hamilton" 4-4-0, his pioneering work with oil fuel, and his unique "Decapod".

== Biography ==
James Holden was born in Whitstable, Kent on 26 July 1837. He was apprenticed to his uncle, Edward Fletcher and, in 1865, joined the Great Western Railway, where he eventually became chief assistant to William Dean. In 1885 he was appointed Locomotive Superintendent of the Great Eastern Railway. He held office from 1885 to 1907 and was succeeded by his son Stephen (1908–1912), who enlarged the "Claud Hamilton" type into the capable Class S69 4-6-0 design.

James Holden was a Quaker. His style of management was rather paternalistic, and trade unionism was not encouraged. Holden had little regard for trade unions and believed employers should voluntarily look after their men. He was responsible for erecting the first hostel (1890) for enginemen arriving in London with late trains from the provinces.

Holden (who lived at Wanstead during his GER days) died in Bath, Somerset on 29 May 1925.

== Locomotive development at the Great Eastern Railway ==
=== Overview ===
While to some extent his work consisted in improving the designs of his predecessors, Holden was responsible for several designs of his own. He completely reorganised Stratford Works, which, together with a considerable degree of standardisation, brought Stratford to an exceptionally high position among British locomotive works in the speed and efficiency of its locomotive production. Some of the extensively-built locomotive classes may not have been outstanding in performance on the road, or in fuel economy, but they were rugged in design and with their massive working parts were reliable and easy to maintain.

=== Wheel arrangements ===
During the first thirteen years of his tenure at the Great Eastern Railway Holden's locomotive designs did not utilise bogies. His predecessors had vacillated between 0-4-4 and 2-4-2 tanks for suburban and branch services, and between both 2-2-2 and 4-2-2, and 2-4-0 and 4-4-0 tender types for express passenger service, but Holden's designs had single axles with side-play rather than a leading or trailing bogie. At the beginning of his tenure the GER possessed some 75 bogie single or four-coupled engines, but by the end of 1897 their number had dwindled to twelve. Then, just as the bogie appeared to be doomed to extinction on the GER, Holden introduced over the next three years new 4-2-2 and 4-4-0 passenger and 0-4-4 tank classes.

=== Boiler, cab, valve gear ===
Holden continued for thirteen years to fit his engines with stovepipe chimneys, and also with Thomas Worsdell's capacious cab, with its gracefully curved side-sheets. Although for a time he continued with the Worsdell three-ring boiler barrel, with the dome on the middle ring, before long he designed a two-ring boiler with the dome on the front ring, immediately behind the chimney. He substituted Stephenson link-motion for the Joy valve gear preferred by Worsdell.

=== Locomotive classes ===
In Holden's first year at Stratford Works four separate locomotive classes were put in hand. These were 2-4-2 tanks, 0-6-0 tanks, 0-6-0 freight engines, and the first of a new 2-4-0 express passenger type. This latter was No. 710, prototype of the well-known T19 Class, which was to prove the mainstay of Great Eastern main line passenger service for many years. While the new engine closely resembled one of the Worsdell Class G14s, the boiler was slightly larger, with 1,230 sq ft (114 m^{2}) as against 1,200 sq ft (110 m^{2}) heating surface, and 18.0 sq ft (1.67 m^{2}) as compared with 17.3 sq ft (1.61 m^{2}) grate area; cylinders were 18 in × 24 in (460 mm × 610 mm), and weight in working order 42 long tons (43 t). Building of these engines continued for eleven years, from 1886 to 1897, until there were 110 of them in all. The first sixty, numbered from 710 to 779 inclusive, had the older three-ring boiler with the dome on the middle ring and a pressure of 140 psi (970 kPa). In 1892 there followed Nos. 700 to 709 and 781 to 790, in 1893 Nos. 1010 to 1019, in 1895 Nos. 1020 to 1029, and in 1897 Nos. 1030 to 1039, with the two-ring boiler and the dome well forward. Not until the last ten did the boiler pressure rise to 160 psi (1,100 kPa), but in course of time all the engines of the class were fitted with 160 psi (1,100 kPa) two-ring boilers.

=== Suburban passenger tanks ===
==== Six-coupled ====
In 1889 one of Holden's shunting tanks engines was fitted with the Westinghouse brake and evaluated on passenger working. The 1889 experiment resulted in eighty of these tanks, slightly larger than Class T18 and classified as GER Class R24, being turned out from 1890 to 1896. They took over the whole of the suburban working between Liverpool Street and Chingford, Enfield Town, and Palace Gates. Twenty shunters of the same type emerged in 1890 and 1891. In addition, in 1889 and 1893, Holden built twenty smaller 0-6-0 tanks (Class E22) with 14 in × 20 in (360 mm × 510 mm) cylinders and a weight of 36 1/2 long tons (37.1 t), for light branch work. Some of the latter worked for years between Fenchurch Street and Blackwall with part of their side rods removed, so converting them to the 2-4-0 wheel arrangement.

The R24 0-6-0s with their packed trains of 15 four-wheelers could reach speeds of up to sixty miles an hour.

When the intensive suburban service of 1920 was introduced reliance was still placed largely on these 0-6-0s to maintain the new split-second timings, and they were quite equal to the task. By then their numbers had been further reinforced by the twenty built in 1900 and 1901 with 160 psi (1,100 kPa) boilers, and by a further twenty turned out in 1904, the latter with 180 psi (1,200 kPa) pressure, larger boilers giving 988 sq ft (91.8 m^{2}) heating surface and 14.5 sq ft (1.35 m^{2}) grate area, and side-tanks holding 1,200 imp gal (5,500 L; 1,400 US gal), which increased the weight to 42 1/2 long tons (43.2 t). Those built from 1912 onwards were decorated with flared-top chimneys, in place of stovepipes, and the high-roofed cab with side-windows which was now the Holden standard.

==== Ten-coupled ====
The Decapod developed mainly under Chief Draughtsman Frederick Vernon Russell was an extraordinary endeavour to develop a steam locomotive which could perform at the level of electric traction. It was built in 1902 to forestall an imminent scheme for an electrified railway out of London to suburbs served by the GER. Since the proponents of the scheme had a slogan about electric trains accelerating to thirty miles an hour in thirty seconds, Holden resolved to obtain the same performance with steam traction. A massive boiler with Wootten firebox, three cylinders each with its own blastpipe cone, and ten smallish driving wheels ensured a lively acceleration. On trial it did rather better than 30 mph (48 km/h) in thirty seconds, accelerating at 1.46 ft/s² (0.45 m/s²): This performance put an end to the electrification scheme even though (as Holden had known all the time) the regular use of so massive a machine would never have been permitted by the civil engineer.

=== Oil fuel and water-scoops ===
Holden developed oil-burning initially in stationary boilers at Stratford Works, but subsequently on suburban locomotives and finally on express locomotives.

Holden's first oil burner of 1893, Petrolea, was a class T19 2-4-0 and burned waste oil that the Railway had previously been discharging into the River Lea. It was largely inspired by Thomas Urquhart's success in Russia, and was eventually followed by more than a hundred additional oil-burners.

When Holden introduced his oil-burning equipment, Nos. 712 and 759 to 767 inclusive were fitted with it, and their tenders acquired on top two cylindrical tanks, arranged longitudinally, to accommodate the oil fuel; No. 760 received the name Petrolea in honour of this change. Nos. 762 to 767 and 1030 to 1039 also had their tenders fitted with water-scoops in preparation for the non-stop running over the 130 miles between Liverpool Street and North Walsham of the summer Cromer Express (later the Norfolk Coast Express), which began on 1 July 1897, water-troughs having been laid down both at Halifax Junction, Ipswich, and at Tivetshall St. Mary for this purpose. The engine chosen for the inaugural run was No. 1037. However, oil burners were progressively discarded by the Great Eastern Railway due to the additional fuel costs.

Holden oil burners were briefly fitted used on steam locomotives by various companies, including the Caledonian Railway during the national coal strike of 1912.

=== Miscellaneous ===
Distinguished services rendered by T19 Class 2-4-0s included the working of the funeral train of the late Duke of Clarence from King's Lynn to Windsor by No. 755 on 28 January 1892, and of the honeymoon train of the Duke and Duchess of York. His most lasting contribution was that of standardization which Gresley wisely did not disrupt leaving the Great Eastern lines with standard locomotives many of which lasted to the end of steam, almost to the end of much railway activity in East Anglia.

== List of locomotive classes ==
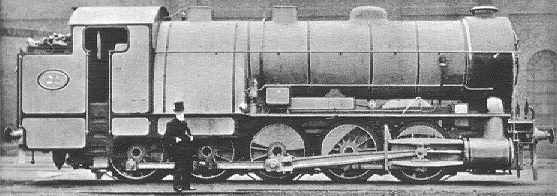
James Holden stands in front of the Decapod.

Please see Whyte notation and Steam locomotive nomenclature for a description of the notation used in the section headings below.

- GER Class T18 (LNER J66) 0-6-0T
- GER Class T19 2-4-0
- GER Class T19 Rebuilt 2-4-0 "Humpty Dumpties"
- GER Class T19 Rebuilt (LNER D13) 4-4-0
- GER Class 127 0-6-0
- GER Class E22 (LNER J65) 0-6-0T
- GER Class R24 (LNER J67/J69) 0-6-0T
- GER Class T26 (LNER E4) 2-4-0
- GER Class D27 2-2-2
- GER Class N31 (LNER J14) 0-6-0
- GER Class C32 (LNER F3) 2-4-2T
- GER Class P43 4-2-2
- GER Class S44 (LNER G4) 0-4-4T
- GER Classes S46 and D56 "Claud Hamilton" (LNER D14/D15) 4-4-0
- GER Class F48 (LNER J16) 0-6-0
- GER Class C53 (LNER J70) 0-6-0 tram engine
- GER Class A55 "Decapod" 0-10-0WT
- GER Class S56 (LNER J69) 0-6-0T
- GER Class G58 (LNER J17) 0-6-0

== Patents ==
- 15547/1894 Improved stays for steam and other boilers, with Reuben Thomas Preston, published 22 June 1895.
- 10860/1896 Improvements in stays for steam and other boilers, with Reuben Thomas Preston, published 10 April 1897.
- GB189902950 Improvements in and in connection with injectors or apparatus for burning liquid fuel, with Arthur Morton Bell and John Charles Taite, Published 9 December 1899.
- 28946/1902 – Improvements in locomotive engines, with Frederick Vernon Russell. Added forked opening to connecting rods. Applied 31 December 1902. Accepted 3 December 1904.
- 708/1903 – Improvements in or relating to apparatus for distributing sand beneath the driving wheels of locomotive engines and other motor vehicles on railways and tramways, with Frederick Vernon Russell. Applied 10 January 1903. Accepted 26 November 1903.
- 6642/1904 – Improvements in and relating to spark-arresting apparatus, with Edmund Spenser Tiddeman. Applied 18 March 1904. Accepted 19 January 1905.
- 21837/1910 – Improvements in and relating to liquid fuel apparatus for the furnaces of locomotive and other boilers, with Frederic Jocelyn Davis and John Charles Taite. Applied 20 September 1910. Accepted 15 June 1911.

== Notes ==
Business positions
Preceded by Thomas William Worsdell	Locomotive Superintendent of the Great Eastern Railway; 1885–1907	Succeeded by S. D. Holden
