= GER Class T26 =

British 2-4-0 stean tender locomotive class

GER Class T26 LNER Class E4
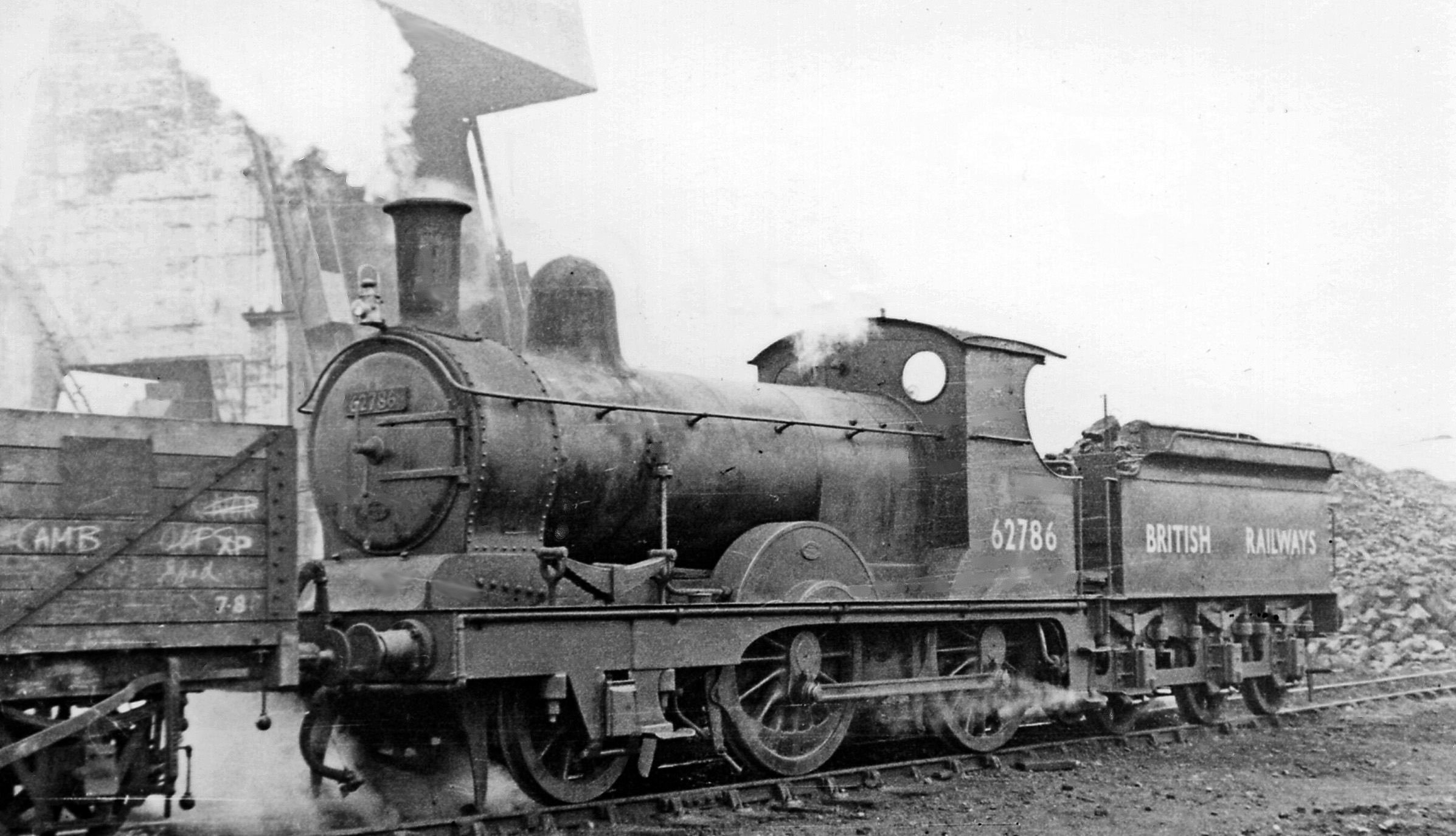
Type and origin
- Power type: Steam
- Designer: James Holden
- Builder: Stratford Works
- Build date: 1891–1902
- Total produced: 100
Specifications
- Configuration
  - Whyte: 2-4-0
  - UIC: 1B n2
- Gauge: 4 ft 8 1/2 in (1,435 mm)
- Leading dia.: 4 ft 0 in (1.22 m)
- Driver dia.: 5 ft 8 in (1.73 m)
- Wheelbase: 36 ft 7 in (11.15 m)
- Length: 48 ft 2 in (14.68 m)
- Loco weight: 40 long tons 6 cwt (90,300 lb or 40.9 t)
- Tender weight: 30 long tons 12.5 cwt (68,600 lb or 31.1 t) loaded
- Fuel type: Coal
- Fuel capacity: 5 long tons 0 cwt (11,200 lb or 5.1 t)
- Water cap.: 2,640 imp gal (12,000 L; 3,170 US gal)
- Boiler pressure: 140 or 160 psi (965 or 1,103 kPa)
- Cylinders: Two, inside
- Cylinder size: 17.5 in × 24 in (444 mm × 610 mm)
Performance figures
- Tractive effort: 12,863 or 14,700 lbf (57.22 or 65.39 kN)
Career
- Power class: BR: 1MT
- Nicknames: Intermediate
- Axle load class: LNER/BR: RA 2
- Withdrawn: 1926–1959
- Disposition: One preserved, remainder scrapped

The GER Class T26 was a class of one hundred 2-4-0 steam tender locomotives designed by James Holden for the Great Eastern Railway. At the 1923 grouping they all passed to the London and North Eastern Railway, who classified them E4. Eighteen survived into British Railways ownership in 1948, and the last was withdrawn in 1959, making them the last 2-4-0 tender locomotives at work in Britain. Their BR numbers were 62780–62797.

== Overview ==
Derived from the GER Class T19 but with much smaller 5 ft 8 in (1.727 m) driving wheels and intended for mixed-traffic work, ninety T26s were built between 1891 and 1896 with 17 in × 24 in (432 mm × 610 mm) cylinders (later 17.5 in × 24 in or 444 mm × 610 mm) and 140 psi (965 kPa) boiler pressure, numbered 417–506. From 1898 some locos were rebuilt with 160 psi (1,103 kPa) pressure boilers thus when an additional ten T26s (numbers 1250–1259) were built in 1902 these were fitted with the new boilers as standard.

== Operation ==
The GER used air brakes but, when introduced, more than half the T26 locomotives were additionally fitted with vacuum brake ejectors for operating over the lines of other railway companies. The T26s were assigned to all the major GER sheds for a wide variety of duties and thus travelled widely.

As mixed-traffic types, the T26s gained the semi-official nickname 'Intermediates'. They were particularly associated with the movement of horses by rail to and from Newmarket Racecourse but also worked fish trains from East Anglian ports to Peterborough for onward dispatch to London and the Midlands, local and cross-country passenger traffic on secondary routes, trains of fruit and flowers to the London markets, as pilot engines for heavy excursion trains to coastal resorts in the summer and events such as the Nottingham Goose Fair. T26s were often used on passenger trains to the Norfolk Coast, particularly Wells and Cromer. After the grouping of 1923 Claud Hamilton 4-4-0s took over most passenger traffic to Wells.

The arrival of more modern 4-4-0 types (themselves displaced from main line express work by new-build LNER locomotives) led to the T26s (classified as E4s by the LNER) being more predominantly used on branch and local passenger duties in the 1920s, and withdrawals began in 1926. In the 1930s six E4s were allocated to the former North Eastern Railway to work passenger services on the difficult, steeply-graded line between Darlington and Penrith over Stainmore Summit - the highest railway summit in England. The NER 4-4-0s used for many years on the route had been retired and various types had been tried as replacements but none had proven suitable. A single E4 was allocated to the line in 1935 and proved very successful. By 1936 five more were in use and all had their cabs modified with solid cab sides and windows rather than the original open sides to offer better protection from the weather on the exposed upland route. Withdrawals were halted during the Second World War and twenty four (of the original 100) E4s were in service at the formation of British Railways in 1948. The introduction of new light BR Standard locomotives, specifically the BR Standard Class 2 moguls, followed by diesel multiple units on many of the rural lines worked by the remaining E4s, led to rapid withdrawal of nearly all the remaining examples between 1954 and 1957 with a single E4, No. 62785, surviving until 1959. The E4s on the Stainmore line were withdrawn in 1957, replaced by DMUs.

== Accidents and incidents ==
- On 12 July 1913, locomotive No. 471 was run into by an express passenger train, hauled by GER Class S69 4-6-0 No. 1506, at Colchester, Essex due to a signalman's error. Three people were killed and fourteen were injured. No. 1506, which was only 4 months old at the time of the accident, was scrapped at Stratford Works following the accident.
- On 20 January 1915, at County School railway station, the junction of the line to Aylsham and Wroxham, GER Y14 0-6-0 No. 629, hauling 12 empty and 4 loaded wagons, ran into the 6 coach passenger train, hauled by T26 locomotive '446'. Nobody was injured in the crash, which took place at low speed, although both locomotives were damaged, along with other vehicles in both trains.
- On 27 May 1931, locomotive No. 7486 was hauling a passenger train that overran signals and was in a head-on collision with a passenger train hauled by locomotive No. 7457 at Fakenham East station, Norfolk. One person was killed and fifteen were injured.

== Livery ==
On introduction the T26 locomotives were painted in the standard GER livery of Ultramarine Blue over an undercoat of French Grey, with black smokebox and vermillion buffer beams and lining. From 1915 locos were not given a top coat and ran in French Grey undercoat but with the boiler bands picked out in black. After the amalgamation of the GER into the LNER in 1923 (the Grouping), the E4s received the LNER mixed traffic livery of black with single red lining and red buffer beams. This lasted until the early 1940s when unlined black with red buffer beams was introduced, and the surviving locos were to carry this livery until their withdrawal.

== Preservation ==
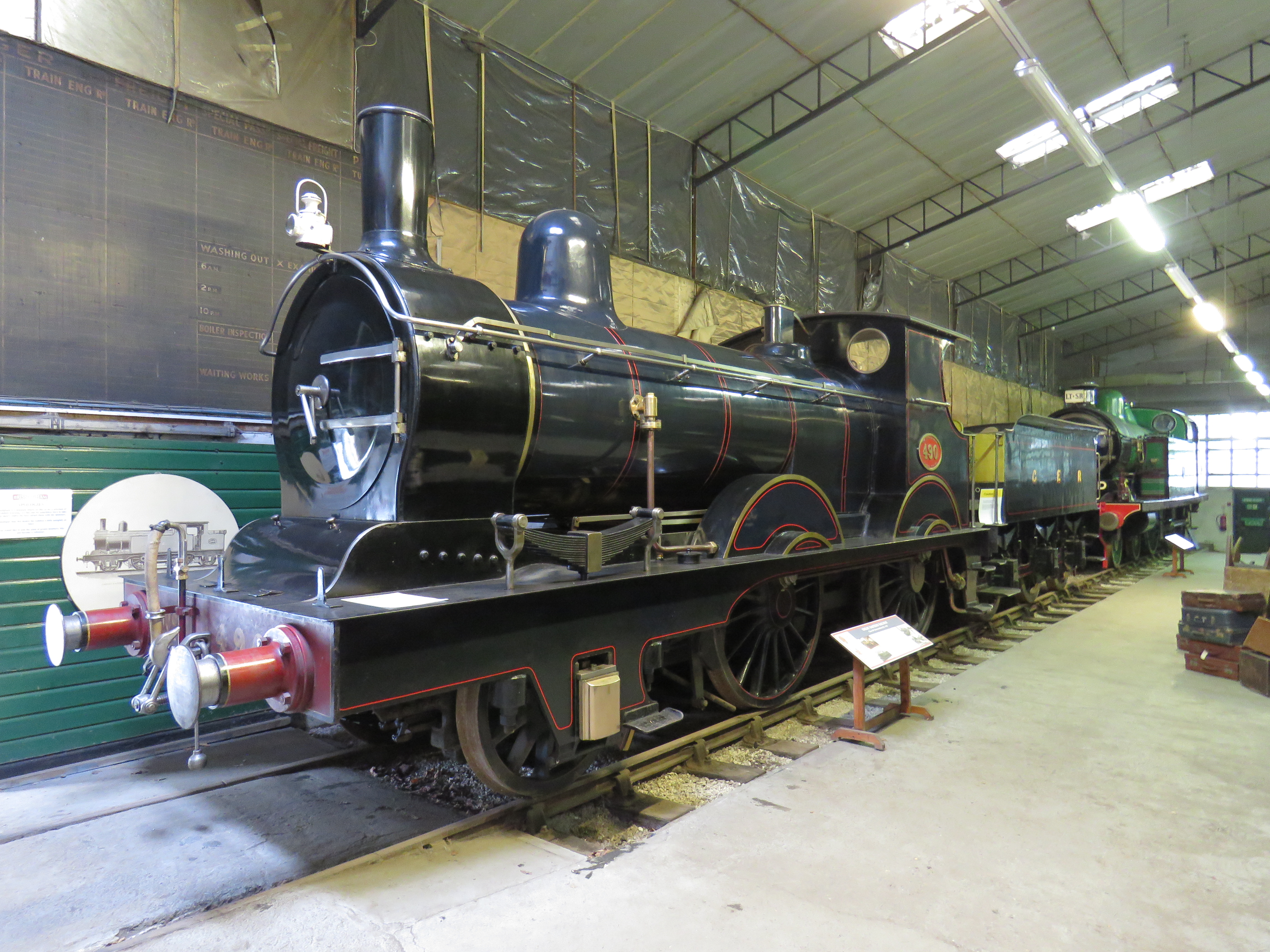
Class T26 number 490 preserved at Bressingham as part of the National Collection

One (GER No. 490, BR No. 62785) has survived to form a part of the National Collection and is currently located at Bressingham Steam Museum. There are Transacord recordings of their gentle chuffing through the byways of East Anglia.

== See also ==
- GER Class T19
