= GER Class P43 =

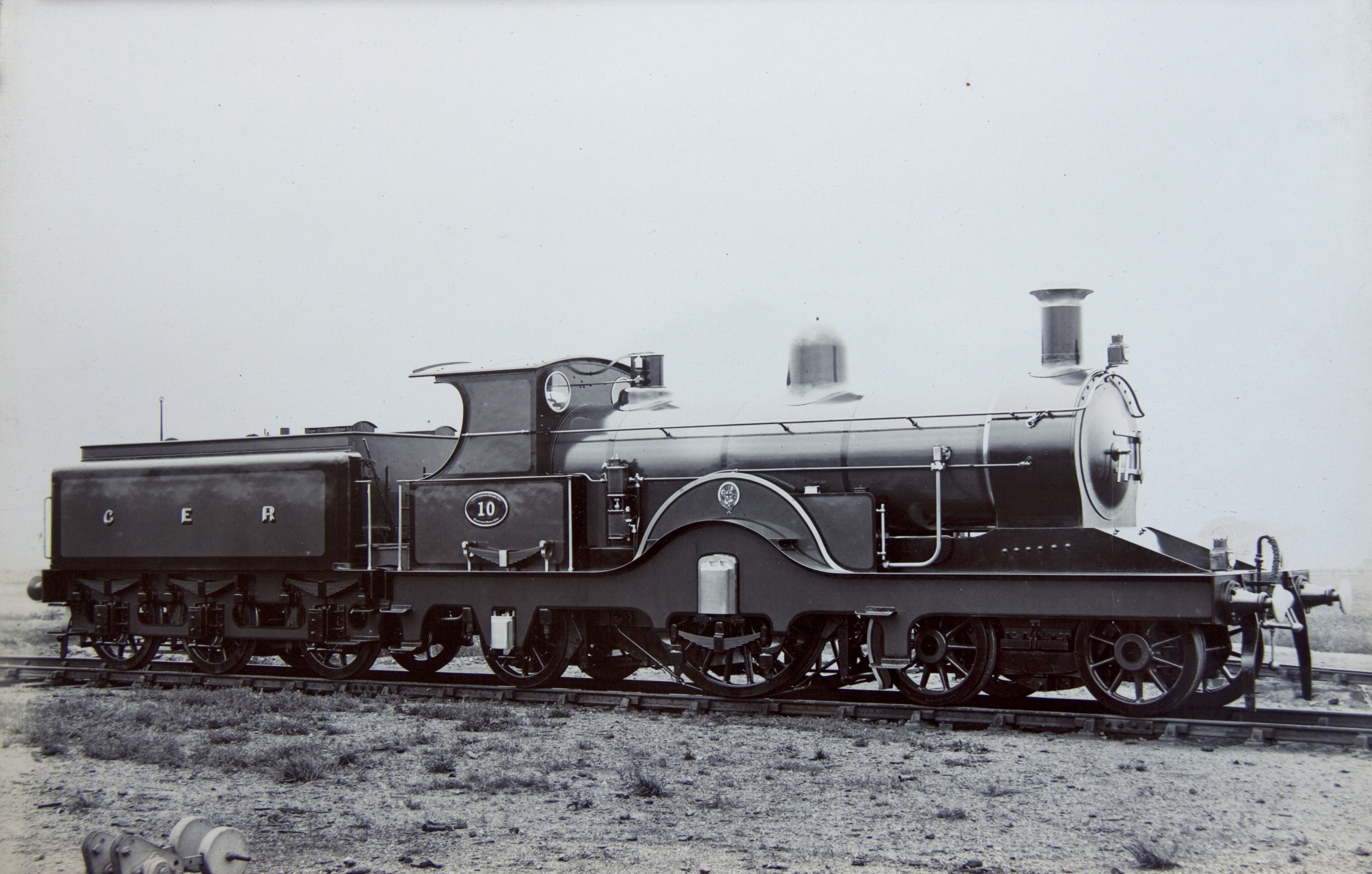
- No. 10, the first of the class.
Type and origin
- Power type: Steam
- Designer: James Holden
- Builder: Stratford Works
- Order number: P43
- Build date: 1898
- Total produced: 10
Specifications
- Configuration
  - Whyte: 4-2-2
  - UIC: 2′A1 n2
- Gauge: 4 ft 8 1/2 in (1,435 mm)
- Leading dia.: 3 ft 9 in (1.143 m)
- Driver dia.: 7 ft 0 in (2.134 m)
- Trailing dia.: 4 ft 0 in (1.219 m)
- Wheelbase: 43 ft 11 in (13.39 m)
- Length: 53 ft 3 in (16.23 m) over buffers
- Adhesive weight: 18 long tons 0 cwt (40,300 lb or 18.3 t)
- Loco weight: 50 long tons 0 cwt (112,000 lb or 50.8 t)
- Tender weight: 30 long tons 12.5 cwt (68,600 lb or 31.1 t)
- Fuel type: Oil (supplemented by coal)
- Fuel capacity: Oil: 650–715 imp gal (2,950–3,250 L; 781–859 US gal); Coal: 1 long ton 10 cwt (3,400 lb or 1.5 t)
- Water cap.: 2,640 or 2,790 imp gal (12,000 or 12,700 L; 3,170 or 3,350 US gal)
- Firebox
  - Grate area: 21.4 sq ft (1.99 m^{2})
- Boiler pressure: 160 lbf/in^{2} (1.10 MPa)
- Heating surface: 1,292.73 sq ft (120.099 m^{2})
- Cylinders: Two,
- Cylinder size: 18 in × 26 in (460 mm × 660 mm)
Performance figures
- Tractive effort: 13,639 lbf (60.67 kN)
Career
- Operators: Great Eastern Railway
- Numbers: 10–19
- Withdrawn: 1907–1910
- Disposition: All scrapped

The GER Class P43 was a class of ten 4-2-2 steam tender locomotives designed by James Holden for the Great Eastern Railway. They were the last 'singles' built for the Great Eastern, and the last in service.

== History ==
Constructed with oil-burning apparatus to speed the elite from the City of London to Cromer, West Runton & Sheringham and capable of reaching North Walsham non-stop in just over two and a half hours. They had 18-by-26-inch (457 mm × 660 mm) inside cylinders and 7-foot-0-inch (2.134 m) driving wheels.

Only a single batch of ten was built, all on order P43 in 1898, numbered 10 to 19. They had a short working life, as they were incapable of handling increasing heavy trains. They were withdrawn between 1907 and 1910.

Table of withdrawals
Year	Quantity in service at start of year	Quantity withdrawn	Locomotive numbers
1907	10	2	14, 18
1908	8	5	10, 11, 15, 16, 17
1909	3	1	19
1910	2	2	12, 13
