= GER Class S44 =

Class of British steam locomotives

GER Class S44 LNER Class G4
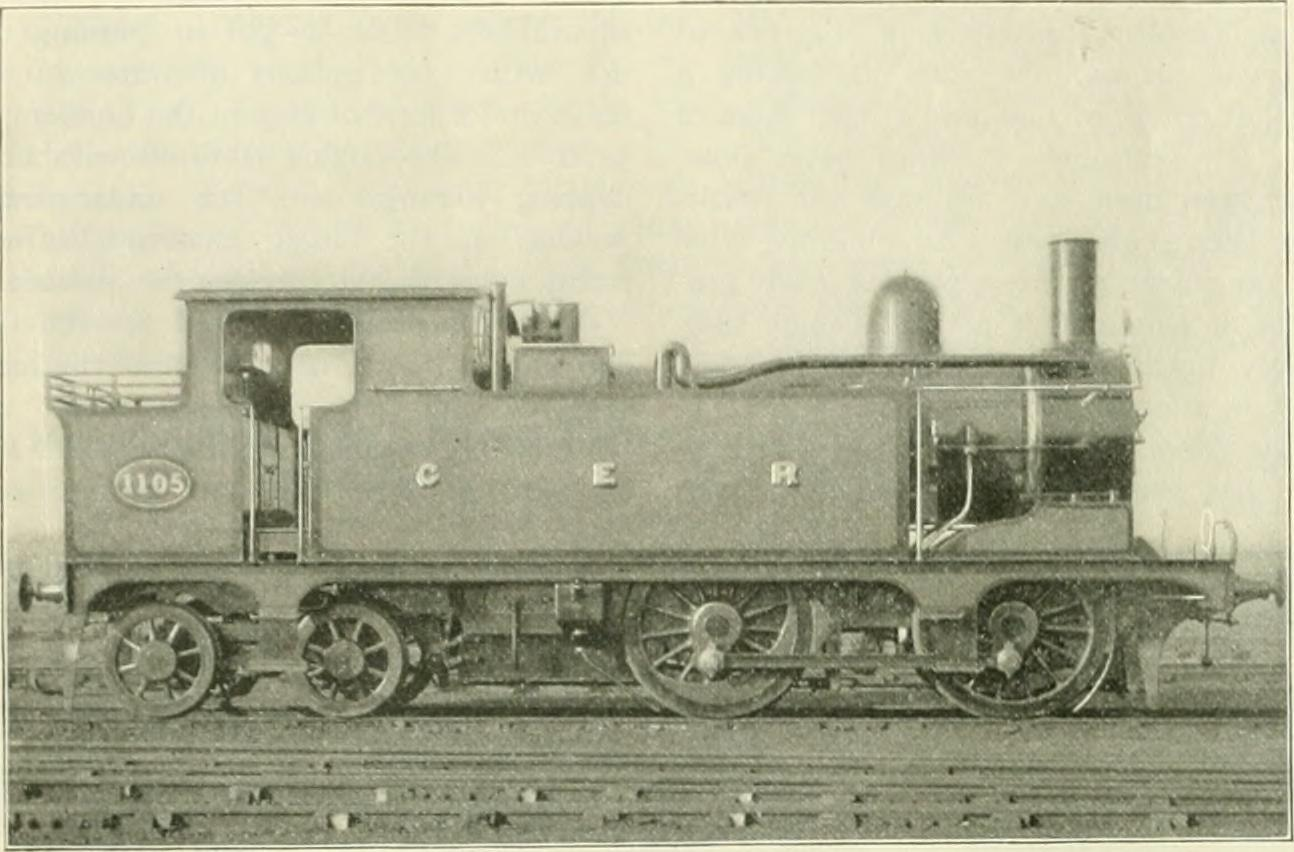
Type and origin
- Power type: Steam
- Designer: James Holden
- Builder: Stratford Works
- Build date: 1898–1901
- Total produced: 40
Specifications
- Configuration
  - Whyte: 0-4-4T
  - UIC: B2′ n2t
- Gauge: 4 ft 8 1/2 in (1,435 mm)
- Driver dia.: 4 ft 11 in (1.499 m)
- Trailing dia.: 3 ft 1 in (0.940 m)
- Wheelbase: 22 ft 4 in (6.81 m)
- Length: 32 ft 8 in (9.96 m)
- Adhesive weight: 34 long tons 2 cwt (76,400 lb or 34.6 t)
- Loco weight: 53 long tons 7.5 cwt (119,600 lb or 54.2 t)
- Fuel type: Coal
- Fuel capacity: 2 long tons 10 cwt (5,600 lb or 2.5 t)
- Water cap.: 1,349 imperial gallons (6,130 L; 1,620 US gal)
- Firebox
  - Grate area: 15.3 sq ft (1.42 m^{2})
- Boiler pressure: 160 MPa (23,206.04 psi)
- Heating surface: 1,084 sq ft (100.7 m^{2})
- Cylinders: Two, inside
- Cylinder size: 17 in × 24 in (430 mm × 610 mm)
Performance figures
- Tractive effort: 15,988 lbf (71.12 kN)
Career
- Operators: GER » LNER
- Class: GER: S44; LNER: G4
- Withdrawn: 1929–1939
- Disposition: All scrapped

The GER Class S44 was a class of forty 0-4-4T steam locomotives designed by James Holden for the Great Eastern Railway. They all passed to the London and North Eastern Railway at the 1923 grouping and received the classification G4.

== History ==
These were the last 0-4-4T locomotives built for the Great Eastern Railway, a type which, as side tanks, the GER had pioneered in Britain. The locomotives were all built at Stratford Works and had 17-by-24-inch (432 mm × 610 mm) inside cylinders driving 4-foot-11-inch (1.499 m) wheels.

Table of orders and numbers
Year	Order	Quantity	GER Nos.	LNER Nos.	Notes
1898–99	S44	10	1100–1109	8100–8109	
1899	F47	10	1110–1119	8111–8119	
1900	R48	10	1120–1129	8120–8129	
1900–01	L50	10	1130–1139	8130–8139	

All were still in service at the 1923 grouping; the LNER adding 7000 to the numbers of nearly all the ex-Great Eastern locomotives, including the Class S44 locomotives. Withdrawals started in 1929 with No. 8133 and finished in 1939 with 8139.

Table of withdrawals
Year	Quantity in service at start of year	Quantity withdrawn	Locomotive numbers	Notes
1929	40	3	8103, 8120, 8133	
1930	37	6	8102, 8108, 8111, 8118, 8121, 8128	
1931	31	12	8100, 8104, 8106, 8107, 8112–8115, 8125, 8127, 8135, 8138	
1932	19	5	8110, 8122, 8129, 8130, 8132	
1933	14	6	8101, 8109, 8116, 8117, 8119, 8126	
1934	8	4	8124, 8131, 8136, 8137	
1936	4	1	8134	
1938	3	2	8105, 8123	
1939	1	1	8139	
