= GER Class S56 =

Class of 20 British 0-6-0T locomotives

GER Class S56 (and R24 rebuilt) LNER Class J69
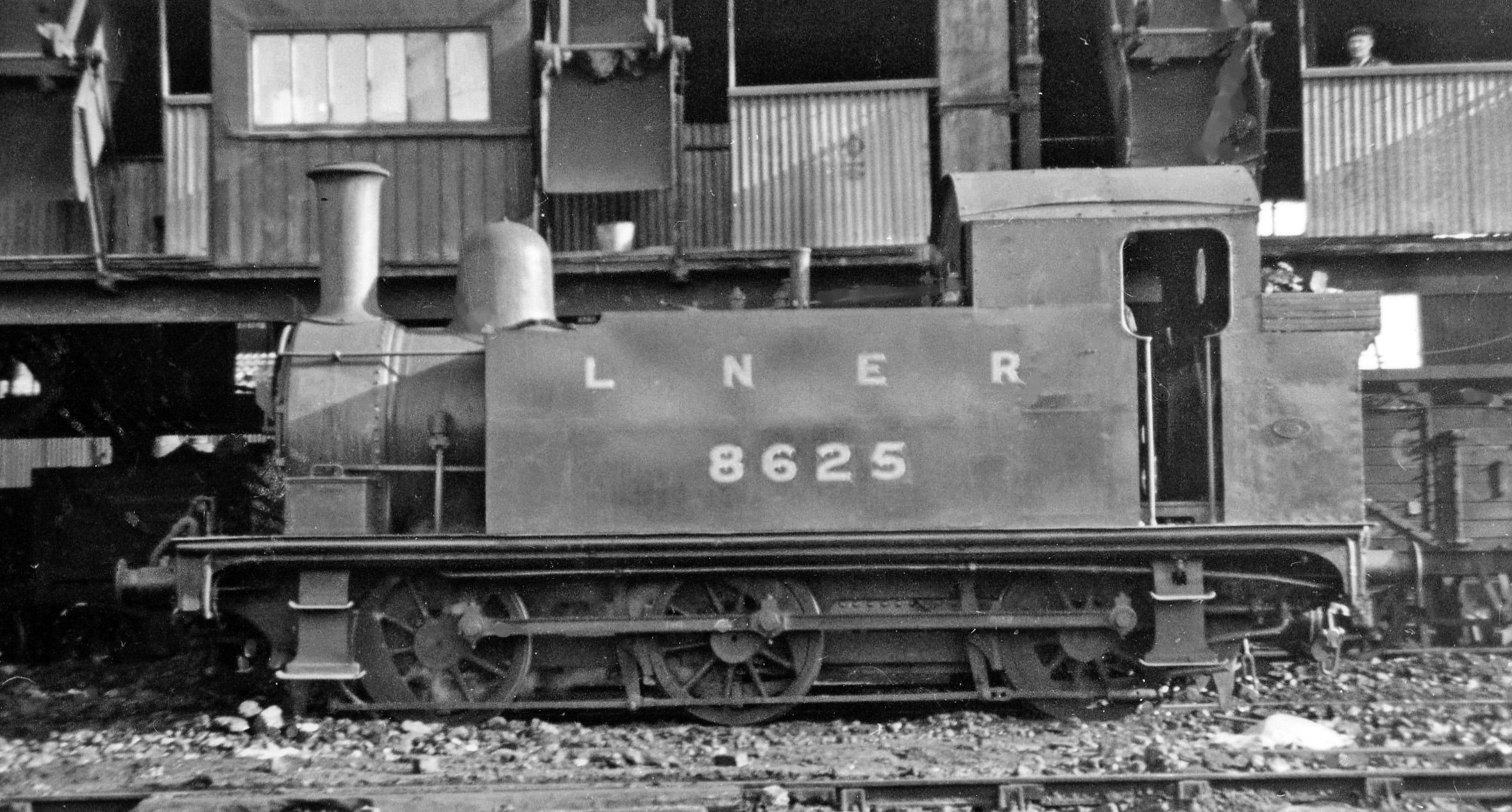
- LNER 8625 (ex-7059, exx-GER 59) at Stratford locomotive depot, 28 September 1946
Type and origin
- Power type: Steam
- Designer: James Holden
- Builder: Stratford Works
- Build date: 1904 (new)
- Total produced: 20 (new)
- Rebuild date: 1902–1921 from Class R24
Specifications
- Configuration
  - Whyte: 0-6-0T
  - UIC: C n2t
- Gauge: 4 ft 8 1/2 in (1,435 mm) standard gauge
- Driver dia.: 4 ft 0 in (1.219 m)
- Wheelbase: 13 ft 10 in (4.22 m)
- Length: 27 ft 8 in (8.43 m)
- Loco weight: 42 long tons 9 cwt (95,100 lb or 43.1 t)
- Fuel type: Coal
- Fuel capacity: 2 long tons 10 cwt (5,600 lb or 2.5 t)
- Water cap.: 1,200 imp gal (5,460 L; 1,440 US gal)
- Firebox
  - Grate area: 14.5 sq ft (1.35 m^{2})
- Boiler pressure: 180 psi (1.24 MPa)
- Heating surface: 996.17 sq ft (92.547 m^{2})
- Cylinders: Two, inside
- Cylinder size: 16.5 in × 22 in (419 mm × 559 mm)
Performance figures
- Tractive effort: 19,091 lbf (84.92 kN)
Career
- Operators: GER » LNER » BR
- Class: GER: S56 or R24R; LNER: J69
- Power class: BR: 2F
- Nicknames: Bucks, Buckjumpers
- Axle load class: LNER/BR: RA 3
- Retired: 1940–1962
- Disposition: One preserved, remainder scrapped

The GER Class S56 was a class of 0-6-0T steam locomotives designed by James Holden for the Great Eastern Railway. Together with some rebuilt examples of GER Class R24, they passed to the London and North Eastern Railway at the grouping in 1923, and received the LNER classification J69.

== History ==
The Class S56 were a development of the Class R24, being almost identical, apart from higher boiler pressure and larger water tanks. Twenty were built in 1904 at Stratford Works. They were designed for the London suburban passenger trains of the GER.

Table of orders and numbers
| Year | Order No. | Quantity | GER Nos. | LNER Nos. | 1946 Nos. | Notes |
|---|---|---|---|---|---|---|
| 1904 | S56 | 10 | 51–60 | 7051–7060 | 8617–19, —, 8621, —, 8623, —, 8625–8626 | |
| 1904 | P57 | 10 | 81–90 | 7081–7090 | —, 8628–8633, —, 8635–8636 | |

All twenty passed to the LNER in 1923. Thirteen class J69 locomotives were lent to the War Department in October 1939, of which five had been built as Class S56. They were sold to the War Department in October 1940, where they were used on the Melbourne and Longmoor Military Railways. The remaining locomotives were renumbered 8617–8636 in order of construction; however gaps were left where the locomotives sold to the War Department would have been. At nationalisation in 1948, the remainder passed to British Railways, who added 60000 to their number. Post-war withdrawals started in 1958, and by 1962 all had been retired.

Table of withdrawals of S56-built locomotives
| Year | Quantity in service at start of year | Quantity withdrawn | Locomotives numbers | Notes |
|---|---|---|---|---|
| 1940 | 20 | 5 | 7054, 7056, 7058, 7081, 7088 | to WD 86, 87, 83, 80, 91 |
| 1958 | 15 | 5 | 68617–18/28/31–32 | |
| 1959 | 10 | 4 | 68625/29–30/36 | |
| 1960 | 6 | 1 | 68633 | |
| 1961 | 5 | 2 | 68619/23 | |
| 1962 | 3 | 3 | 68621/26/35 | |

== Preservation ==
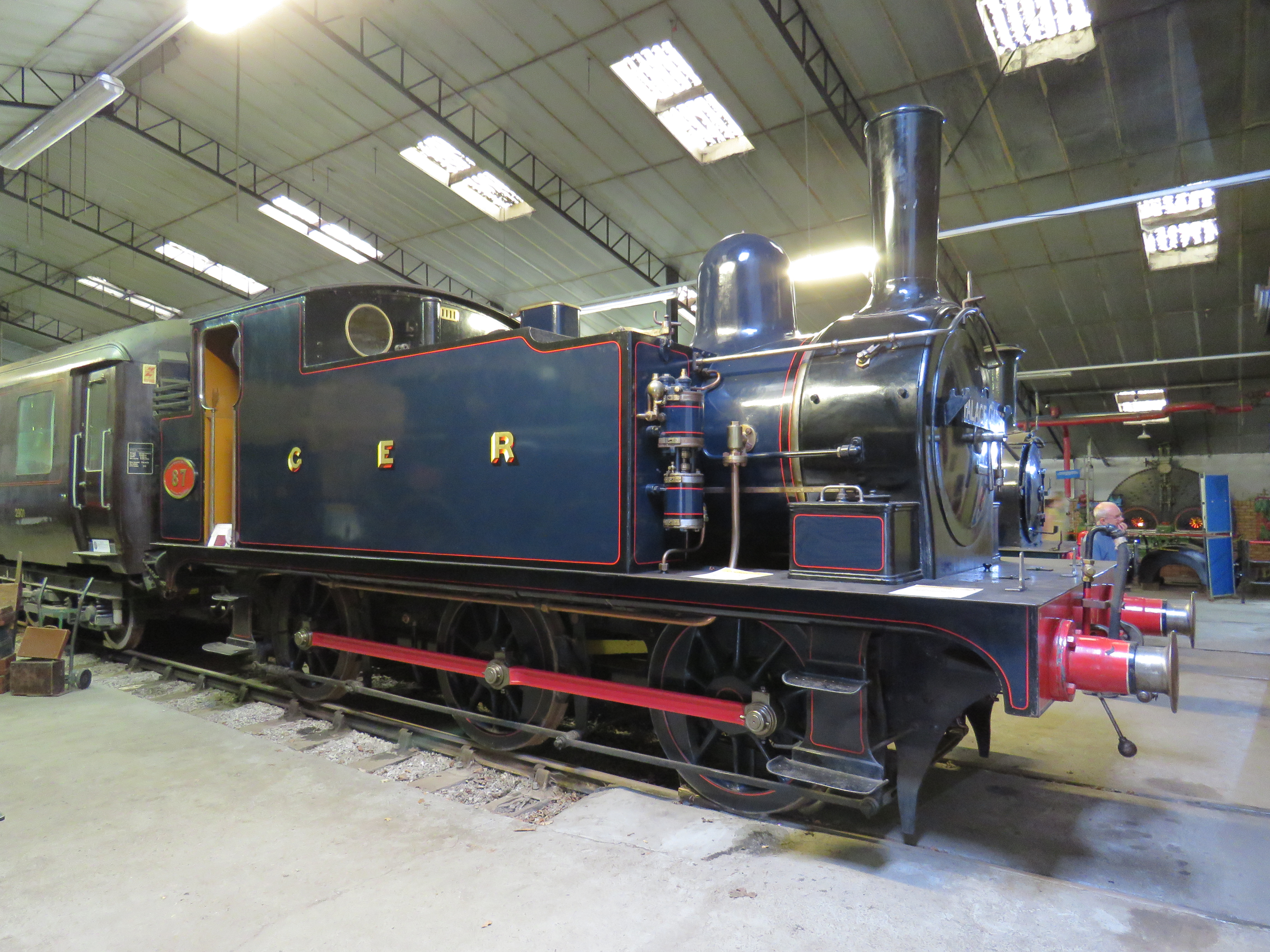
GER no. 87 on display at Bressingham

GER no. 87 (LNER 7087, 8633, BR 68633) has been preserved, initially at the Clapham Transport Museum, and now at the National Railway Museum. It is currently on display at Bressingham Steam Museum.
