= GER Class G14 =

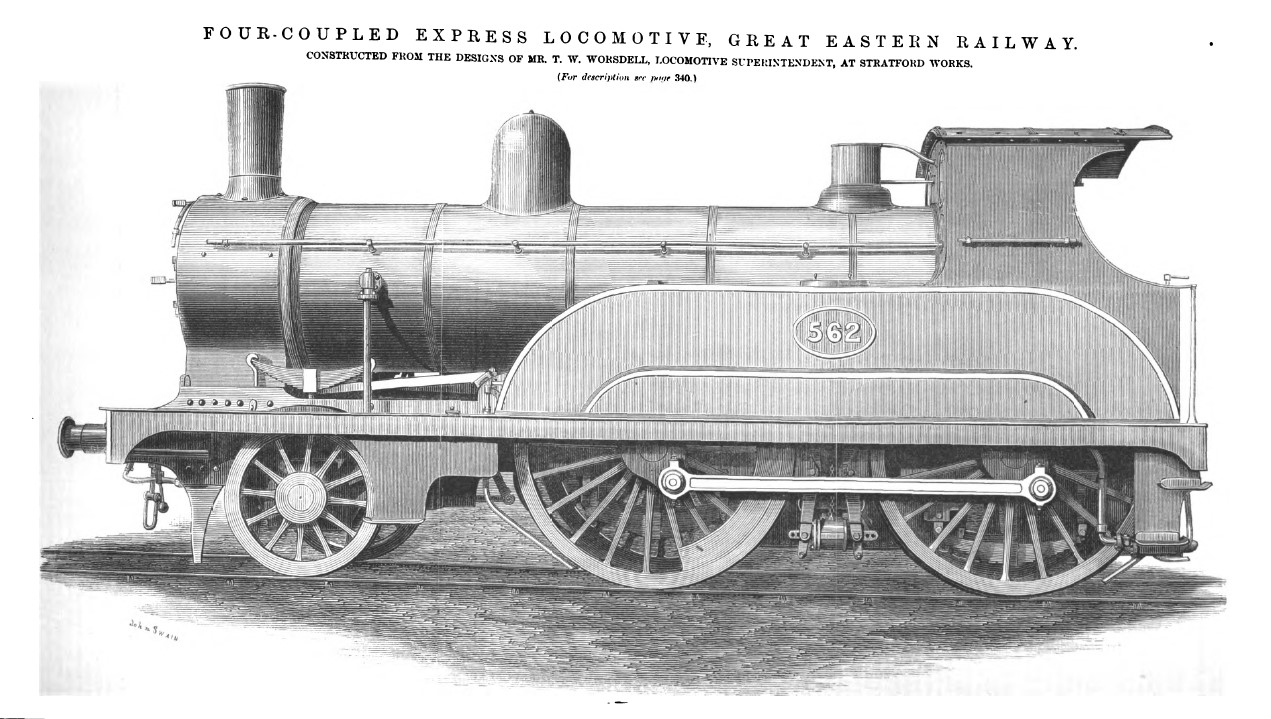
- No. 562
Type and origin
- Power type: Steam
- Designer: T. W. Worsdell
- Builder: Stratford Works
- Build date: 1882-1883
- Total produced: 20
Specifications
- Configuration
  - Whyte: 2-4-0
- Gauge: 4 ft 8 1/2 in (1,435 mm) standard gauge
- Driver dia.: 7 ft 0 in (2.134 m)
- Loco weight: 38.1 long tons (38.7 t; 42.7 short tons)
- Fuel type: Coal
- Fuel capacity: 5 long tons (5.1 t; 5.6 short tons)
- Water cap.: 3,200 imp gal (15,000 L; 3,800 US gal)
- Boiler pressure: 140 psi (970 kPa)
- Cylinders: Two, inside
- Cylinder size: 18 in × 24 in (457 mm × 610 mm)
Career
- Operators: Great Eastern Railway
- Class: GER: G14
- Disposition: All scrapped by 1901

The Great Eastern Railway (GER) Class G14 was a class of 2-4-0 steam locomotives.

The Class G14 was designed by Thomas William Worsdell for the express service from London to Norwich, the first locomotive produced while he was superintendent. A total of 20 were built, 562–564 in late 1882 and the rest in 1883.

== Details ==
The locomotive was designed for the Great Eastern Railway's London to Norwich route on which the frequent sharp curves between London and Cambridge necessitated that the wheelbase not be entirely rigid, so a radial axle box was fitted to the front wheels giving 1.5 in (3.8 cm) of side motion each way controlled by a horizontal elliptical spring. It used Joy valve gear, with the valves placed on top of the cylinders, allowing them to be brought closer together allowing larger cylinders and longer bearings, the Joy valve motion having the benefit of not requiring space on the crankshaft for eccentrics.

The locomotives were numbered 562 to 571, and 640 to 649, 20 in total.

== Accidents/Incidents ==
- In Swaffham, on 31 January 1894, G14 No. 567 managed to either run across the turntable, or reverse out of it instead of moving forward, and crashed through the buffer stops and down a steep bank tender first. The locomotive fortunately being saved by the tender which jammed between the rear of the locomotive and the road below that separated the engine yard from Northwell Pool.
