= GER Class T18 =

Class of British steam locomotives (1886–1888)

GER Class T18 LNER Class J66
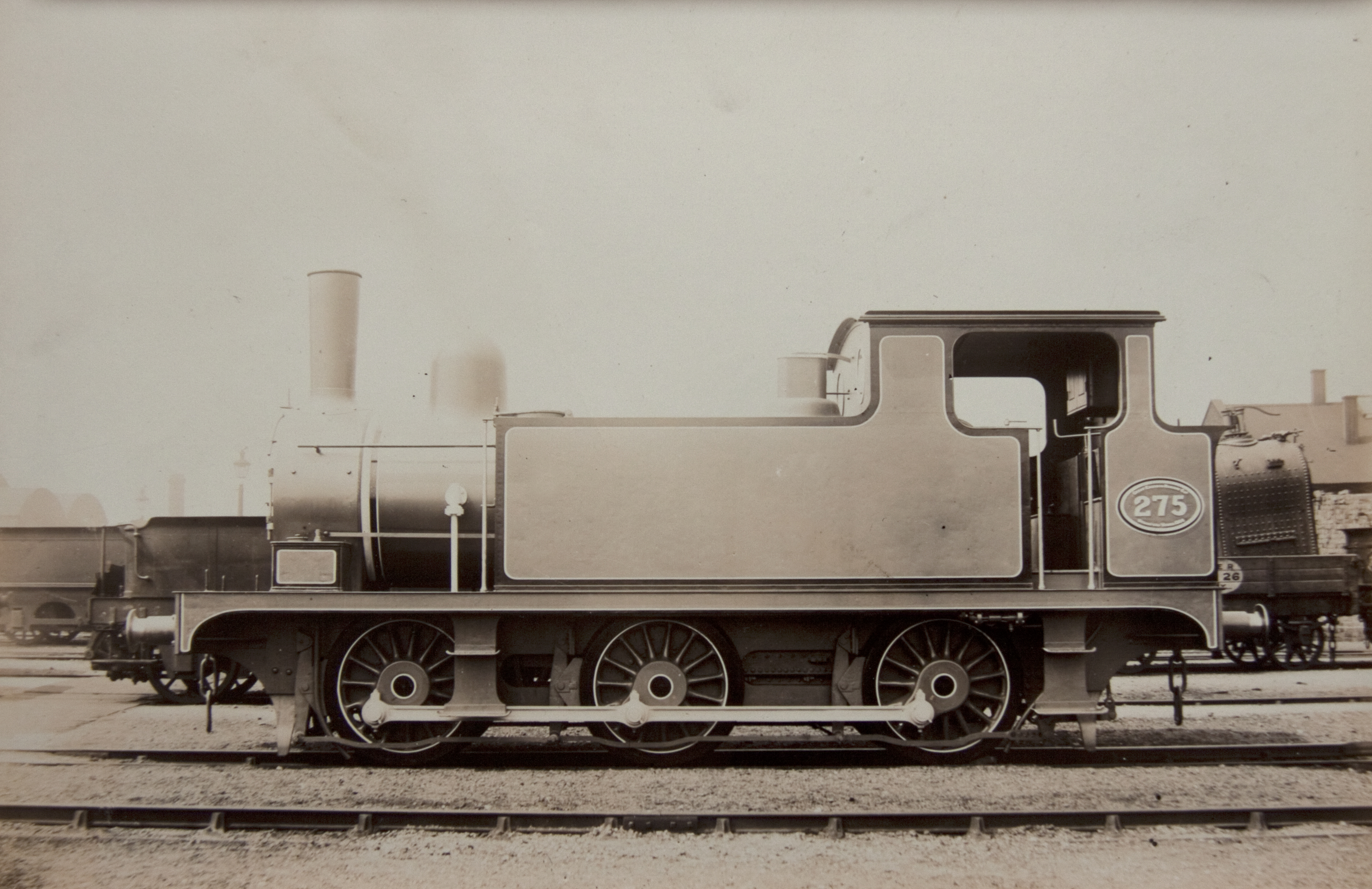
- Class T18 locomotive No. 275
Type and origin
- Power type: Steam
- Designer: James Holden
- Builder: Stratford Works
- Build date: 1886–1888
- Total produced: 50
- Rebuild date: 1898–1908
Specifications
- Configuration
  - Whyte: 0-6-0T
  - UIC: C n2t
- Gauge: 4 ft 8 1/2 in (1,435 mm)
- Driver dia.: 4 ft 0 in (1.219 m)
- Wheelbase: 13 ft 4 in (4.06 m)
- Length: 28 ft 2 1/2 in (8.60 m) over buffers
- Loco weight: 40 long tons 5.75 cwt (90,200 lb or 40.9 t)
- Fuel type: Coal
- Fuel capacity: 2 long tons 10 cwt (5,600 lb or 2.5 t)
- Water cap.: 1,000 imp gal (4,550 L; 1,200 US gal)
- Firebox
  - Grate area: 12.4 sq ft (1.15 m^{2})
- Boiler pressure: Originally: 140 lbf/in^{2} (0.97 MPa) later: 160 lbf/in^{2} (1.10 MPa)
- Heating surface: 987.4 sq ft (91.73 m^{2})
- Cylinder size: 16 1/2 in × 22 in (419 mm × 559 mm)
- Valve gear: Stephenson
- Valve type: Slide valves
Performance figures
- Tractive effort: 16,970 lbf (75.49 kN)
Career
- Operators: GER » LNER » BR
- Class: GER: T18; LNER: J66
- Power class: BR: 2F
- Axle load class: LNER/BR: Route Availability 3
- Withdrawn: 1936–1955
- Disposition: All scrapped

The GER Class T18 was a class of fifty 0-6-0T steam locomotives designed by James Holden for the Great Eastern Railway. They passed to the London and North Eastern Railway at the grouping in 1923 and received the LNER classification J66.

== Overview ==
When James Holden took office on the Great Eastern, there were few 0-6-0T locomotives, most shunting being done by 0-4-4T and obsolete tender locomotives.

These small locomotives had 16 1/2-by-22-inch (419 by 559 mm) cylinders, 4-foot-0-inch (1.219 m). coupled wheels and a grate area of 12.4 sq ft (1.15 m^{2}). They were rebuilt between 1898 and 1908.

Table of orders and numbers
Year	Order	Builder	Quantity	GER Nos.	LNER Nos.	Notes
1886	T18	Stratford Works	10	275–284	7275–7284	
1887	K19	Stratford Works	20	285–304	7285–7304	
1888	H21	Stratford Works	10	307–316	7307–7316	
1888	T21	Stratford Works	10	317–326	7317–7326	

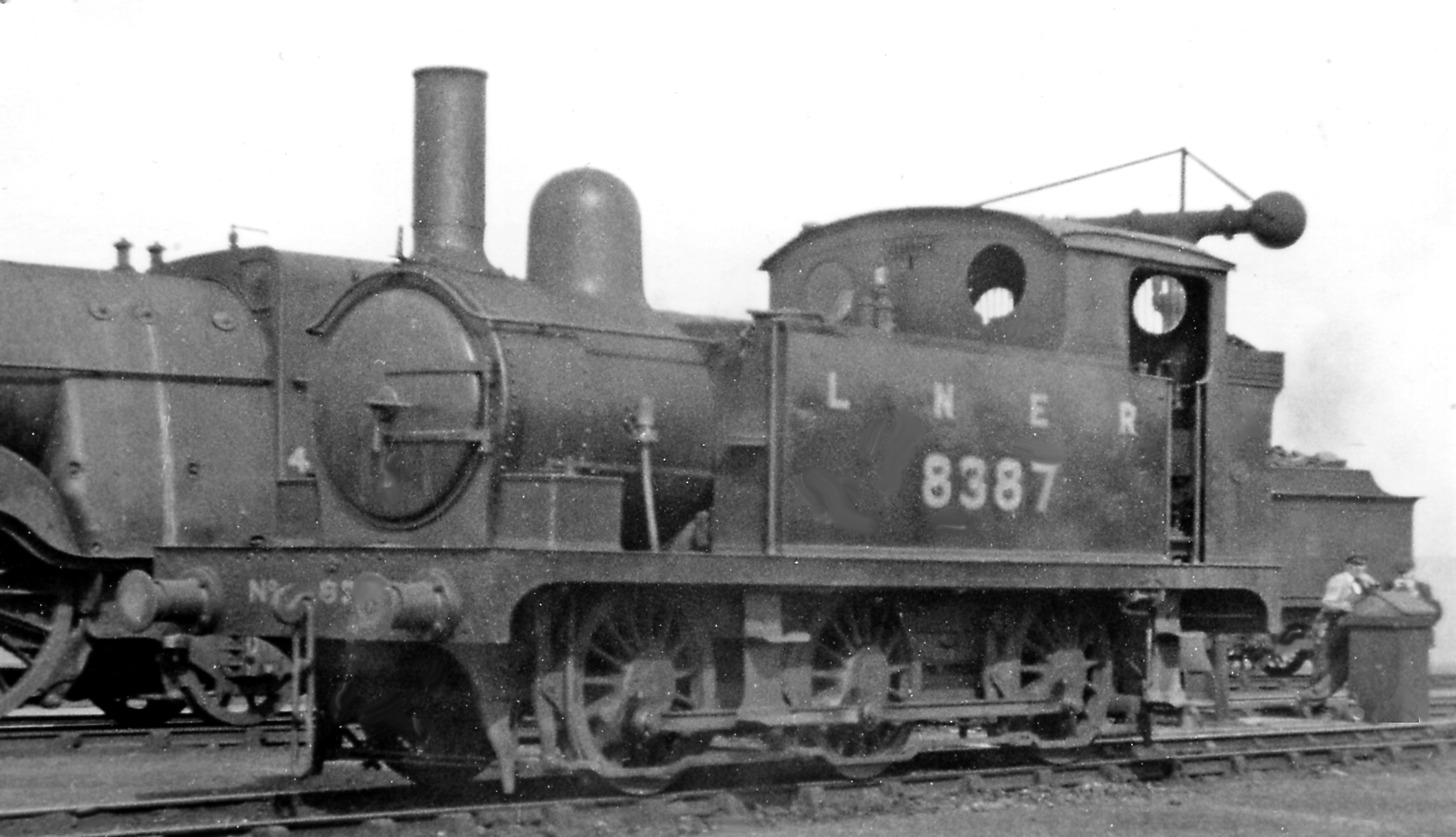
No. 8387 at March Locomotive Depot 17 July 1946.

Withdrawals started in 1936 when four (7278, 7287, 7303 and 7308) were sold to Sir Robert McAlpine and Son, the latter concern also having five on loan from late 1936 to mid-1938. Three others were sold, with No. 297 going to the Mersey Railway in 1939 as their No. 3 to work ballast trains. By the end of 1940, thirty-one had been withdrawn, and the remaining 19 locomotives continued with no further retirements until 1950. In the LNER 1944 renumbering plan, the locomotives were renumbered 8370–8388. Withdrawal restarted in 1950 and all were gone by the end of 1955.

In 1952, three locomotives, 8370 and 8378, and 8382 were transferred to the service list as 32, 36, and 31 respectively.
