= S. D. Holden =

British engineer (1870–1918)

Stephen Dewar Holden
- Born: 23 August 1870; Saltney
- Died: 7 July 1918 (aged 47); Rochester, Kent
- Education: University College School
- Parent: James Holden
- Engineering career
- Discipline: Locomotive engineer
- Institutions: Institution of Mechanical Engineers
- Employer: Great Eastern Railway
- Significant design: GER Class S69 4-6-0

Stephen Dewar Holden (23 August 1870 – 7 February 1918) was a British engineer, the son of the engineer James Holden and succeeded his father as locomotive superintendent of the Great Eastern Railway in 1908, a post he held until his retirement in 1912.

== Biography ==
Holden was born at Saltney, Cheshire on 23 August 1870, the third son of James Holden, who at that time was superintendent of the Great Western Railway workshops at Chester. After a private education, he attended University College School, London.

Upon leaving school at the age of 16, he joined the Great Eastern Railway (GER) at their Stratford Works, London, where his father had been Locomotive, Carriage and Wagon Superintendent since 1885. There he studied under his father for four years, following which he worked in the drawing office for 18 months; he then became an inspector in the running department. In October 1892 he became Suburban District Locomotive Superintendent; two years later he was transferred to Ipswich, and in July 1897 he returned to London, as divisional locomotive superintendent. Several more promotions - including Chief of the Running Department, and Assistant Locomotive Superintendent - led to him succeeding his father as Locomotive Superintendent from January 1908.

In 1910, Holden was elected a Member of the Institution of Mechanical Engineers. He resigned from the GER in October 1912, being replaced by A.J. Hill.

Holden died at Rochester, Kent on 7 February 1918; his father died seven years later.

== Locomotives ==
The locomotives produced at Stratford during S.D. Holden's term of office were a continuation of James Holden's designs, due in part to the retention of his father's Chief Draughtsman, E.S. Tiddeman. Repeat orders were placed for older designs, some of which dated back to James Holden's predecessor, T.W. Worsdell. There were some new designs, the most notable of which was the Class S69 4-6-0 of 1911, the first six-coupled express locomotives on the GER, a total of 81 being built down to 1928; under the LNER, some of these were sent to north-eastern Scotland. Other new designs included two classes of 2-4-2T, which despite being of different sizes, used similarly-sized cabs: the smaller engines, Class Y65, gaining the nickname "Crystal Palace Tanks" from the relatively large amount of glass for such small engines; the larger 2-4-2T, Class G69, was essentially an updated version of an existing design, as was the last of Holden's new classes, the Class C72 0-6-0T.

Holden also tried some of the recent developments in steam locomotive technology, such as superheaters. A batch of ten Class D56 "Claud Hamilton" 4-4-0s built in 1911 included four with superheaters, two each having the Schmidt and the Swindon pattern superheaters; but from 1914, when further locomotives of the class were fitted with superheaters after Holden's resignation, these were of the Robinson type. Holden and Tiddeman jointly took out a patent (no. 8028) for a superheater design; applied for on 3 April 1912, it was accepted on 3 April 1913.

Locomotives built for the GER during Holden's term of office
GER class (LNER)	Wheel arrangement	Years built	Total	Designer	Ref
D56 (D15)	4-4-0	1908–11	50	J. Holden	
C53 (J70)	0-6-0T	1908–10	4	J. Holden	
M15 (F4)	2-4-2T	1908–09	30	Worsdell	
Y65 (F7)	2-4-2T	1909–10	12	S.D. Holden	
G58 (J17)	0-6-0	1910–11	10	J. Holden	
G69 (F6)	2-4-2T	1911–2	20	S.D. Holden	
S69 (B12)	4-6-0	1911–12	5	S.D. Holden	
Y14 (J15)	0-6-0	1912	10	Worsdell	
C72 (J68)	0-6-0T	1912	10	S.D. Holden	

Of the four new classes, two were subsequently perpetuated by A.J. Hill: there were 66 further Class S69 4-6-0 built between 1913 and 1920, with a final 10 being built for the LNER in 1928; ten Class C72 0-6-0T were built in 1913–14 and ten more in 1923, the latter being delivered to the LNER.

== Notes ==
Business positions
Preceded by James Holden	Locomotive Superintendent of the Great Eastern Railway; 1908-1912	Succeeded by Alfred John Hill
