= D81 =

D81 may refer to:

- GER Class D81, class of twenty-five 0-6-0 steam locomotives for the Great Eastern Railway
- HMAS Quiberon (D81), Q-class destroyer of the Royal Australian Navy (RAN)
- HMS Bruce (D81), Admiralty type flotilla leader of the Royal Navy
- HMS Frobisher (D81), Hawkins-class heavy cruisers built for the Royal Navy

== See also ==
- .d81 or Commodore 1581, 3½-inch double-sided double-density floppy disk drive
- D. 81, Song "Auf den Sieg der Deutschen" for voice, two violins and cello (1813) by Franz Schubert
