= Alfred John Hill =

Alfred John Hill CBE (1 January 1862 – 1 January 1927) was Chief Mechanical Engineer at the Stratford Works of the Great Eastern Railway from 1912 to 1922.

His best-known design is probably the GER Class L77 0-6-2 tank locomotive which was perpetuated (as Class N7) by Nigel Gresley of the London and North Eastern Railway after the 1923 grouping.

He was made a Commander of the Order of the British Empire in the 1918 Birthday Honours.

== Locomotive designs ==
- GER Class C72 (LNER Class J68 0-6-0T)
- GER Class B74 (LNER Class Y4 0-4-0T)
- GER Class L77 (LNER Class N7 0-6-2T)
- GER Class T77 (LNER Class J19 0-6-0)
- GER Class D81 (LNER Class J20 0-6-0)
- GER Class H88 (LNER Class D16 4-4-0)
- GER Class S69 (LNER Class B12 4-6-0)

Business positions
Preceded by S. D. Holden	Locomotive Superintendent of the Great Eastern Railway; 1912–1922	Succeeded by Nigel Gresley (LNER)
