= E72 =

E72 may refer to:

- European route E72
- King's Indian Defense, Encyclopaedia of Chess Openings code
- Nokia E72, a 2009 mobile phone.
- Kitakinki-Toyooka Expressway, route E72 in Japan
- GER Class E72, a class of British steam locomotives
