= T77 =

T77 may refer to:

== Automobiles ==
- Bestune T77, a Chinese crossover
- Cooper T77, a British racing car
- Tatra 77, a Czechoslovak sedan

== Other uses ==
- GER Class T77, a steam locomotive
- Hunter T 77, a British-built trainer aircraft
- INS Koswari (T77), a patrol vessel of the Indian Navy
- T77 submachine gun, a Taiwanese submachine gun
