= GER Class F48 =

Class of British 0-6-0 steam locomotives

GER Class F48 LNER Class J16
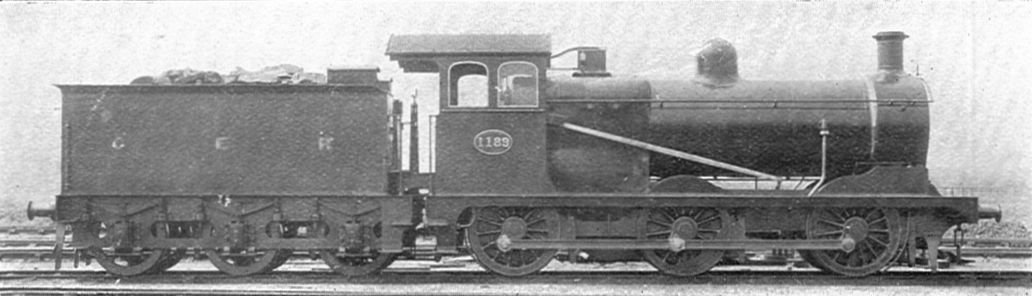
- No. 1189, with its unique Belpaire firebox
Type and origin
- Power type: Steam
- Designer: James Holden
- Builder: Stratford Works
- Build date: 1900–1903
- Total produced: 60
Specifications
- Configuration
  - Whyte: 0-6-0
  - UIC: C n2
- Gauge: 4 ft 8 1/2 in (1,435 mm)
- Driver dia.: 4 ft 11 in (1.499 m)
- Wheelbase: 38 ft 0 in (11.58 m)
- Length: 50 ft 6 in (15.39 m)
- Loco weight: 44 long tons 11 cwt (99,800 lb or 45.3 t)
- Tender weight: 38 long tons 5 cwt (85,700 lb or 38.9 t)
- Fuel type: Coal
- Firebox
  - Grate area: 21.3 sq ft (1.98 m^{2})
- Boiler pressure: 180 lbf/in^{2} (1.24 MPa)
- Heating surface: 1,630.5 sq ft (151.48 m^{2})
- Cylinders: Two, inside
- Cylinder size: 19 in × 26 in (483 mm × 660 mm)
Performance figures
- Tractive effort: 24,340 lbf (108.27 kN)
Career
- Operators: GER » LNER
- Class: GER: F48; LNER: J16
- Power class: BR: 4F
- Axle load class: LNER/BR: Route availability 4
- Disposition: All rebuilt to LNER Class J17

The GER Class F48 was a class of sixty 0-6-0 steam tender locomotives designed by James Holden for the Great Eastern Railway in Great Britain. They passed to the London and North Eastern Railway at the grouping in 1923 and received the LNER classification J16.

== History ==
The F48 class, of which there were sixty, were built between 1900 and 1903 at Stratford Works, and had round-top fireboxes of the same type as used on the Class S46 Claud Hamilton 4-4-0s. No. 1189 was built instead with a Belpaire firebox, being the first Great Eastern locomotive to be so fitted. This was done as a comparative experiment against the regular round-top firebox. The experiment was a success and a further thirty locomotives constructed later were fitted with Belpaire fireboxes and termed the G58 class.

=== Reboilering ===
From 1921, all the round-top boilers were replaced by the Belpaire type, the majority being superheated. Sixteen had been reboilered by the Great Eastern before the grouping of 1923. The remaining forty-three were reboilered by the London and North Eastern Railway and were re-classified J17. All had been dealt with by 1932, whereupon the Class J16 ceased to exist.

=== Blastpipes ===
At first Macallan blastpipes were fitted, but later the Stone's variable blastpipe was substituted. Plain blastpipes were substituted between 1924 and 1929.

== LNER ownership ==
The former Class F48 locomotives were renumbered 5500–5559 in the LNER's 1946 renumbering scheme. The exception was 8200, which had been damaged beyond repair in a V-2 attack in November 1944.

== BR ownership ==
All the remaining locomotives passed to British Railways in 1948, and had 60000 added to their number. They were withdrawn between 1953 and 1962.

== Table of orders and numbers ==
Table of orders and numbers
Year	Order No.	Quantity	GER No.	LNER No.	1946 No.	Notes
1900	F48	10	1150–1159	8150–8159	5500–5509	
1900–01	H50	10	1160–1169	8160–8169	5510–5519	
1901	L52	10	1170–1179	8170–8179	5520–5529	
1901–02	P52	10	1180–1189	8180–8189	5530–5539	
1902	B54	10	1190–1199	8190–8199	5540–5549	
1902–03	P54	10	1200–1209	8200–8209	—, 5551–5559	
