= GER Class E72 =

Class of British 0-6-0 steam locomotives

GER Class E72 LNER Class J18
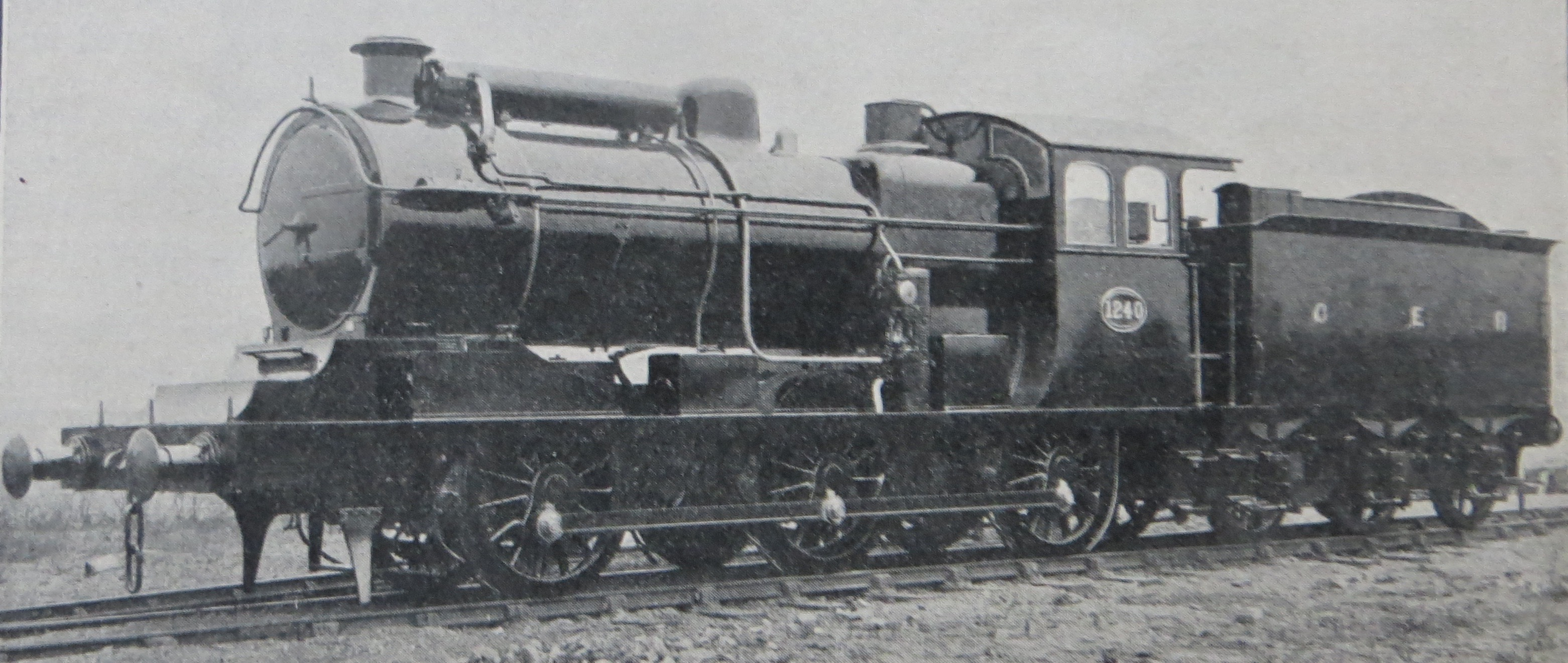
- 0-6-0 GER Class E72 No. 1240 fitted with Weir feed pump and heater about 1915
Type and origin
- Power type: Steam
- Designer: S. D. Holden
- Builder: Stratford Works
- Order number: E72
- Build date: 1912
- Total produced: 10
Specifications
- Configuration
  - Whyte: 0-6-0
  - UIC: C h
- Gauge: 4 ft 8 1/2 in (1,435 mm)
- Driver dia.: 4 ft 11 in (1.499 m)
- Wheelbase: 38 ft 7 in (11.76 m)
- Length: 53 ft 8 1/2 in (16.37 m) over buffers
- Loco weight: 47 long tons 7.5 cwt (106,100 lb or 48.1 t)
- Fuel type: Coal
- Firebox
  - Grate area: 21.6 sq ft (2.01 m^{2})
- Boiler pressure: 160 lbf/in^{2} (1.10 MPa)
- Heating surface: 1,501.1 sq ft (139.46 m^{2})
- Superheater: Schmidt
- Cylinders: Two, inside
- Cylinder size: 20 in × 28 in (508 mm × 711 mm)
Performance figures
- Tractive effort: 25,817 sq ft (2,398.5 m^{2})
Career
- Operators: GER » LNER » BR
- Class: GER: E72; LNER: J18
- Withdrawn: 1958–1961
- Disposition: All scrapped

The GER Class E72 was a class of ten 0-6-0 steam locomotives designed by S. D. Holden for the Great Eastern Railway. They all passed to the London and North Eastern Railway at the 1923 grouping and received the classification J18.

== History ==
These locomotives had 20-by-28-inch (508 mm × 711 mm) inside cylinders driving 4-foot-11-inch (1.499 m) wheels. They had a distinctive front overhang, not possessed by any other GER 0-6-0 class. This was needed to clear the cylinder tail rods. Locomotive 1240 was fitted for a time with a Weir feedwater heater and pump, with the heater component mounted on the boiler between the dome and chimney.

Table of orders and numbers
Year	Order	Manufacturer	Quantity	GER Nos.	LNER Nos.	1946 Nos.	Notes
1912	E72	Stratford Works	10	1240–1249	8240–8249	4640–4649	

All were still in service at the 1923 grouping; the LNER adding 7000 to the numbers of nearly all the ex-Great Eastern locomotives, including the Class E72 locomotives. Between 1935 and 1936, the LNER rebuilt them in line with its standards, and reclassified them as class J19/2, the same as the rebuilt GER Class T77 (which had been LNER class J19, later J19/1, before rebuilding).

At nationalisation in 1948, British Railways added 60000 to their LNER numbers. They all continued in service until 1958, when the first was withdrawn; all were gone by the end of 1961.

Table of withdrawals
Year	Quantity in service at start of year	Quantity withdrawn	Locomotive numbers	Notes
1958	10	1	64645	
1959	9	4	64640/44/48–49	
1960	5	3	64641–42/47	
1961	2	2	64643/46	
