= GER Class G58 =

0-6-0 steam tender locomotive of the Great Eastern Railway

GER Class G58 LNER Class J17
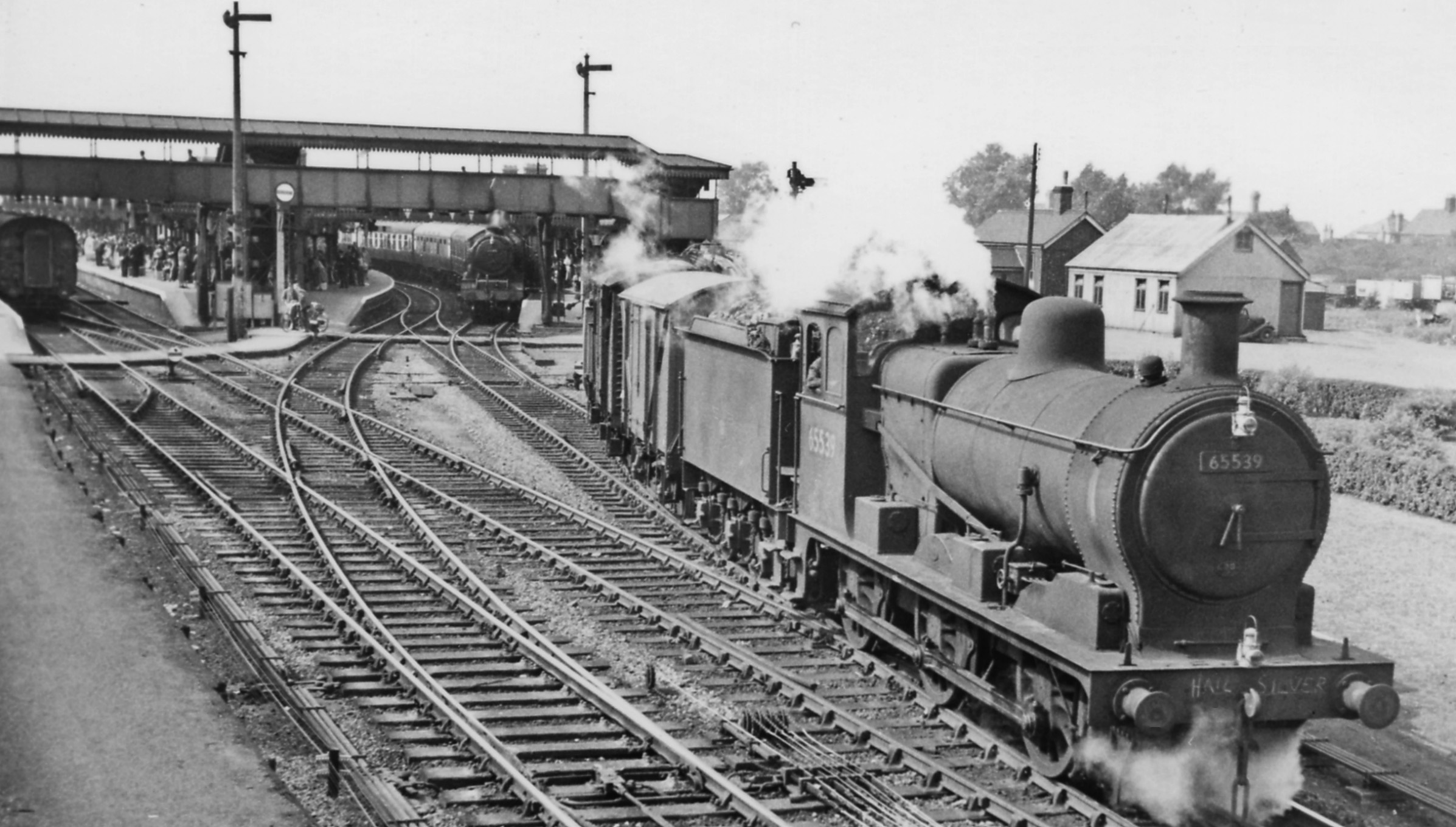
Type and origin
- Power type: Steam
- Designer: James Holden
- Builder: Stratford Works
- Build date: 1905–1911
- Total produced: 30
- Rebuild date: 1921–1932
- Number rebuilt: 60 from Class F48
Specifications
- Configuration
  - Whyte: 0-6-0
  - UIC: C h2
- Gauge: 4 ft 8 1/2 in (1,435 mm)
- Driver dia.: 4 ft 11 in (1.499 m)
- Wheelbase: 38 ft 0 in (11.58 m)
- Length: 50 ft 6 in (15.39 m)
- Loco weight: 45 long tons 7.75 cwt (101,700 lb or 46.1 t)
- Tender weight: 38 long tons 5 cwt (85,700 lb or 38.9 t)
- Fuel type: Coal
- Fuel capacity: 5 long tons 0 cwt (11,200 lb or 5.1 t)
- Water cap.: 3,500 imp gal (16,000 L; 4,200 US gal)
- Firebox
  - Grate area: 21.6 sq ft (2.01 m^{2})
- Boiler pressure: 180 lbf/in^{2} (1.24 MPa)
- Heating surface: 1,501.1 sq ft (139.46 m^{2})
- Cylinders: Two, inside
- Cylinder size: 19 in × 26 in (483 mm × 660 mm)
Performance figures
- Tractive effort: 24,340 lbf (108.27 kN)
Career
- Operators: GER » LNER » BR
- Class: GER: G58, LNER: J17
- Power class: BR: 4F
- Axle load class: LNER/BR: RA 4
- Withdrawn: 1944, 1953–62
- Disposition: One preserved, remainder scrapped

The GER Class G58 (LNER Class J17) is a class of 0-6-0 steam tender locomotives designed by James Holden for the Great Eastern Railway in England. The class consisted partly of new locomotives built from 1905 to 1911 and partly of rebuilds of the earlier GER Class F48 built from 1900 to 1903. The rebuilding started under GER auspices from 1921 and was continued by the London and North Eastern Railway (LNER) after grouping in 1923.

== History ==
The earlier GER Class F48 were built between 1900 and 1903 and had round-top boilers; there were sixty of them. The G58 had Belpaire fireboxes, like those fitted to the F48 No. 1189, and later fitted to the Class D56 Claud Hamilton 4-4-0s. A further thirty of the Belpaire boiler type followed to form Class G58.

Table of orders and numbers (Class G58)
Year	Order No.	Quantity	GER Nos.	LNER Nos.	1946 Nos.	Notes
1905	G58	10	1210–1219	8210–8219	5560–5569	
1905–06	S59	10	1220–1229	8220–8229	5570–5579	
1910–11	T67	10	1230–1239	8230–8239	5580–5589	

=== Superheating ===
The class was superheated between 1915 and 1932. From 1921, all the round-top boilers were replaced by the Belpaire type and the majority were of the superheated type.

=== Blastpipes ===
At first Macallan blastpipes were fitted, but later the Stone's variable blastpipe was substituted. Plain blastpipes were substituted between 1924 and 1929.

== LNER ownership ==
On the LNER, those retaining round-top fireboxes were classified J16, and those built, or rebuilt, with Belpaire fireboxes were classified J17. The J16 category ceased to exist in 1932.

== BR ownership ==
All the J16s had been rebuilt as J17s by 1932 and 89 J17s passed to British Railways (BR) in 1948. BR numbers were 65500–65589, of which 65500–59 were the rebuilds from F48 (J16). One number (65550) was blank, because locomotive no. 8200 had been destroyed in a German V-2 rocket explosion at Stratford in November 1944. The second locomotive was withdrawn in 1953, and the last in 1962.

== Preservation ==
GER no. 1217 (LNER 8217, 5567, BR 65567) was withdrawn in 1962 and acquired privately for preservation. It is owned by the National Railway Museum, York, as part of the UK National Collection, but is on loan to the Barrow Hill Roundhouse and Railway Centre.

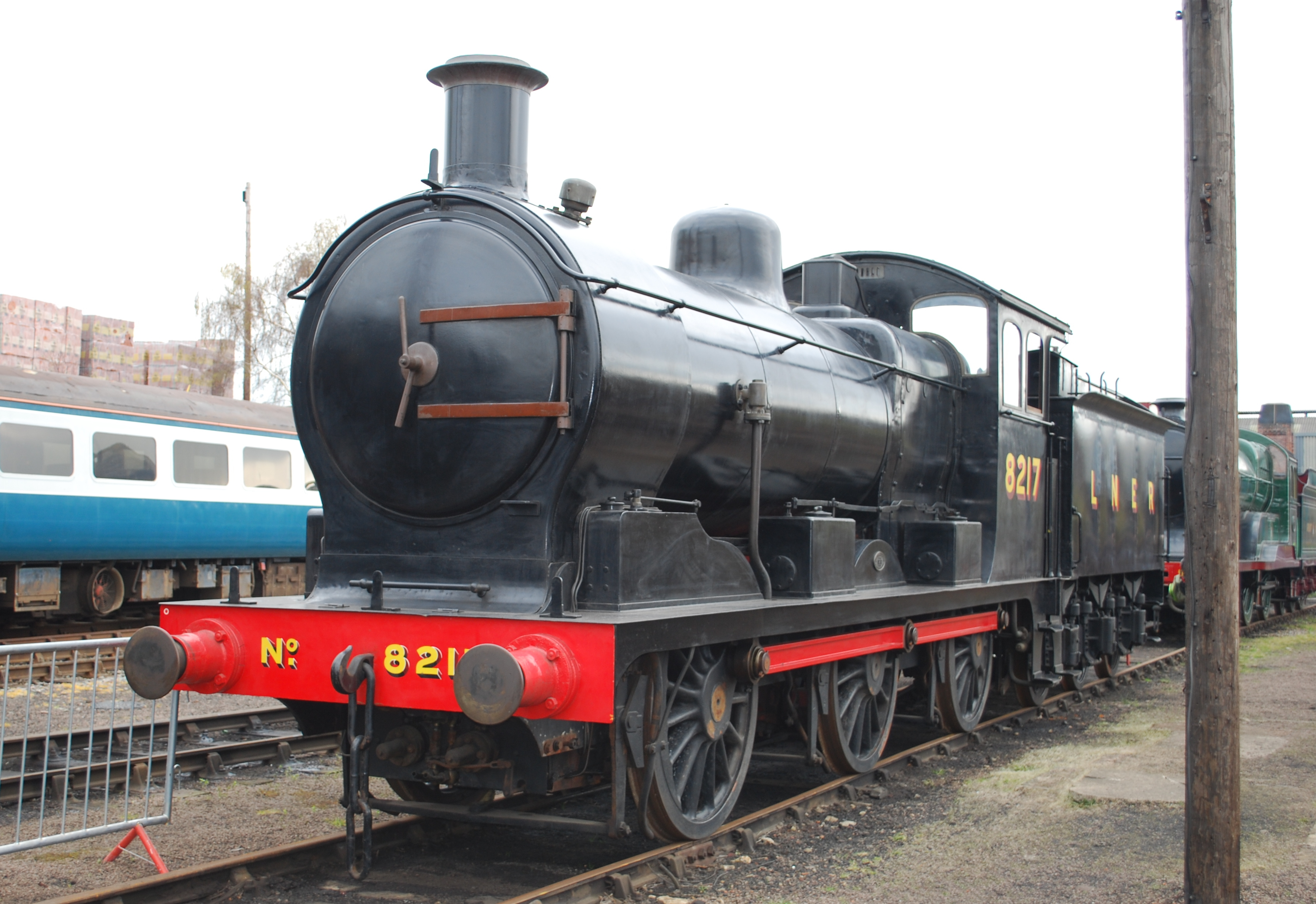
G58 No. 1217

== Modelling ==
A 4 mm scale kit is available from PDK Models
