= GER Class L77 =

Class of British steam locomotives

GER Class L77 LNER Class N7
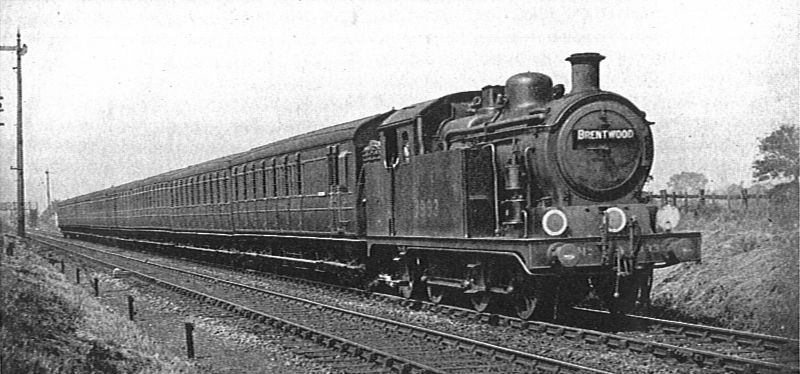
- N7/1 on a suburban train for Brentwood, c.1927
Type and origin
- Power type: Steam
- Designer: A. J. Hill
- Builder: Stratford Works (22); Gorton Works (40); Robert Stephenson & Co. (20); William Beardmore & Co. (20); Doncaster Works (32)
- Build date: 1915–1928
- Total produced: 134
Specifications
- Configuration
  - Whyte: 0-6-2T
  - UIC: C1 h2t
- Gauge: 4 ft 8 1/2 in (1,435 mm) standard gauge
- Driver dia.: 4 ft 10 in (1.473 m)
- Trailing dia.: 3 ft 9 in (1.143 m)
- Wheelbase: 23 ft 0 in (7.01 m)
- Length: 34 ft 10 in (10.62 m) over buffers
- Axle load: 16 long tons 3 cwt (36,200 lb or 16.4 t)
- Adhesive weight: 49 long tons 4 cwt (110,200 lb or 50 t)
- Loco weight: 61.8–64.85 long tons (62.79–65.89 t)
- Fuel type: Coal
- Fuel capacity: 3 long tons 5 cwt (7,300 lb or 3.3 t)
- Water cap.: 1,600 imperial gallons (7,270 L; 1,920 US gal)
- Firebox
  - Grate area: 17.7 sq ft (1.64 m^{2})
- Boiler pressure: 180 psi (1.24 MPa)
- Heating surface: 1,291.7 sq ft (120.00 m^{2})
- Cylinders: Two, inside
- Cylinder size: 18 in × 24 in (457 mm × 610 mm)
- Valve gear: Walschaerts
Performance figures
- Tractive effort: 20,512 lbf (91.24 kN)
- Factor of adh.: 5.37
Career
- Operators: Great Eastern Railway; → London and North Eastern Railway; → British Railways
- Class: GER: L77; LNER: N7
- Power class: BR: 3MT
- Number in class: 1 January 1923: 12; 1 January 1948: 134
- Axle load class: LNER/BR: Route availability 5
- Withdrawn: 1957–1962
- Disposition: One preserved, remainder scrapped

The GER Class L77, LNER Class N7, is a class of 0-6-2T steam locomotives. They were designed by Alfred John Hill of the Great Eastern Railway and introduced in 1915. The design was perpetuated by Nigel Gresley of the LNER after the 1923 grouping. 134 were built and one example is preserved.

== Overview ==
The N7s had superheaters and piston valves. They were unusual (for inside-cylinder locomotives) in having Walschaerts valve gear. They were, as London suburban locomotives, fitted with Westinghouse air brakes.

Some were fitted with condensing apparatus for working on the Metropolitan line and the East London Line but the condensing apparatus was removed between 1935 and 1938.

== Numbering ==
The first 22 were allocated numbers in the 990–1011 range when ordered by the GER, but the last 10 did not emerge until the grouping. The LNER added 7000 to their GER numbers, and then built a further 112 locomotives between 1925 and 1928. In the 1946 renumbering scheme, they were renumbered 9600–9733, and upon nationalisation in 1948, British Railways added 60000 to their number (69600–69733).

Table of orders and numbers
Year	Order	Manufacturer	Quantity	GER Nos.	LNER Nos.	1946 Nos.	Notes
1915	L77	Stratford Works	2	1000–1001	8000–8001	9600–9601	Renumbered 7978–7979 in 1944
1921	K85	Stratford Works	10	1002–1011	8002–8011	9602–9611	Renumbered 7980–7989 in 1944
1923–24	K89	Stratford Works	10	(990–999)	7990–7999	9612–9621	
1925–26	—	Gorton Works	30	—	409, 421, 426, 456, 457, 460, 464, 471, 473, 475, 826–830, 832–834, 837, 838, 850–853, 865–868, 870, 873	9622–9651	Class N7/1
1925–26	—	Robert Stephenson & Co. 3897–3916	20	—	907, 912, 913, 916, 918, 919, 935, 940, 941, 947, 950, 952, 964, 966–968, 970, 971, 987, 988	9652–9671	Class N7/1
1927–28	—	Gorton Works	10	—	2632–2641	9672–9681	Class N7/2
1927	—	Wm. Beardmore & Co. 305–324	20	—	2642–2661	9682–9701	Class N7/2
1927–28	—	Doncaster Works 1669–1692, 1696–1699, 1701/02/04/06	32	—	2600–2631	9702–9733	Class N7/3

== Sub-classes ==
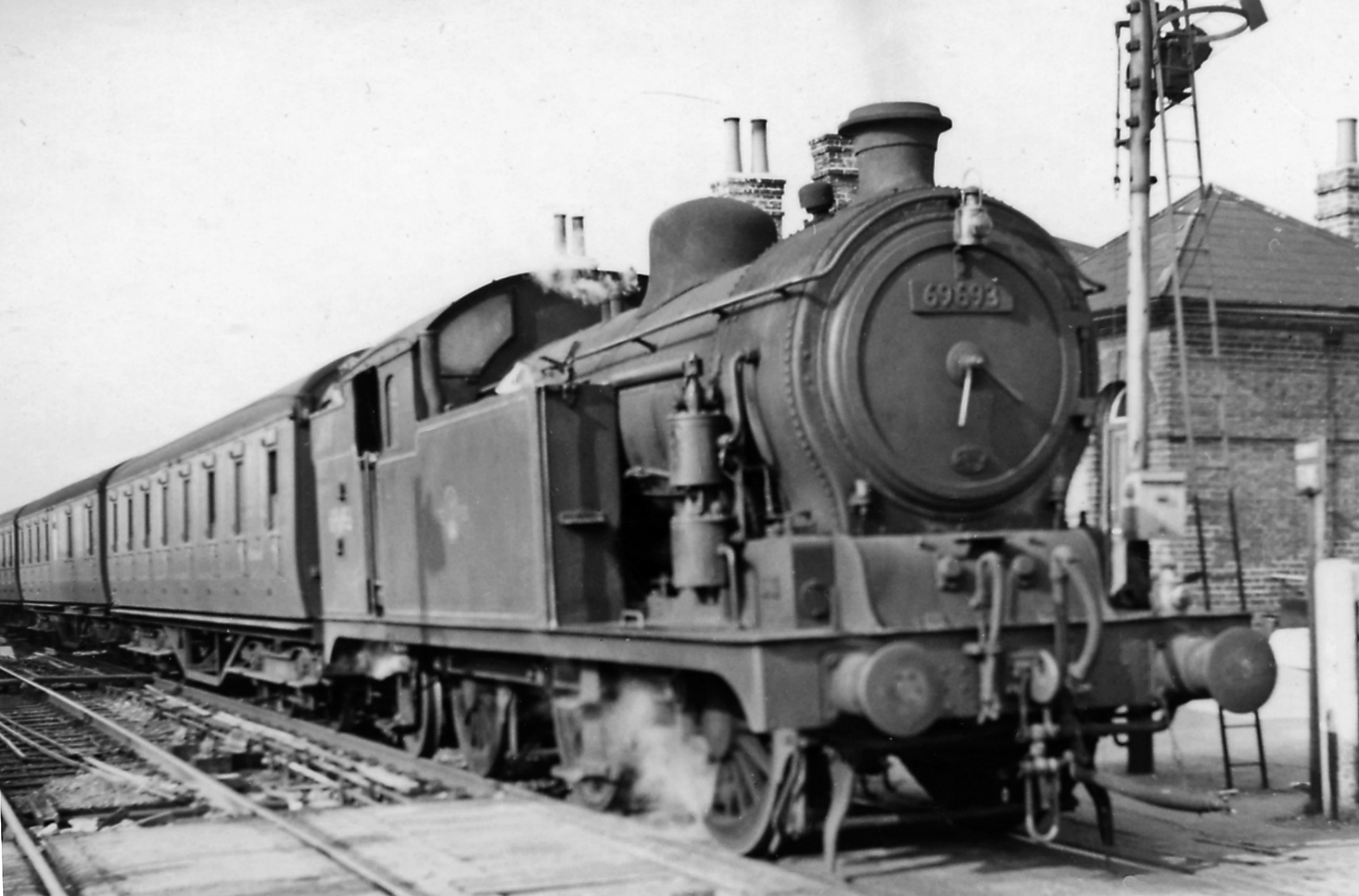
N7/3 No. 69693 (with a round-top firebox) at St Margarets 4 April 1959

- N7 Introduced 1914, GER Class L77 with Belpaire firebox
- N7/1 Introduced 1925, LNER development of GER design with Belpaire firebox
- N7/2 Introduced 1926, LNER locos with Belpaire firebox and long-travel valves
- N7/3 Introduced 1927, LNER locos with round-top firebox, plus from 1943, rebuilds of N7/2 with round-top firebox
- N7/4 Introduced 1940, GER locos rebuilt with round-top firebox
- N7/5 Introduced 1943, N7/1 locos rebuilt with round-top firebox

Table of withdrawals
Year	Quantity in service at start of year	Quantity withdrawn	Locomotive numbers	Notes
1957	134	1	69689	
1958	133	10	69601/06–09/24/28/41/43/95	
1959	123	41	69600/02–05/10/12–13/16/19/22–23/25–27/33–35/37–39/44/49–50/55/57/59–62/66–67/69/72/76, 69703/05/11/16–17/31	
1960	82	45	69611/14–15/17/20/29–30/36/42/45/47–48/52/54/63–65/77/80–85/87–88/91/94/99, 69700–01/04/06/09/12/15/18–22/26–27/29/33	
1961	37	28	69618/31/51/56/58/68/70/73–75/78–79/86/90/93/96/98, 69702/07–08/10/13–14/23–24/28/30/32	
1962	9	9	69621/32/40/46/53/71/92/97, 69725	69621 preserved

== Accidents and incidents ==
- On 20 May 1930, locomotive No. 471 was hauling a passenger train from Chingford when it ran into the buffer stop at Liverpool Street station. Thirty-two of the 150 passengers were injured. The cause was driver error.
- On 24 May 1954, locomotive No. 69638 ran into the turntable pit at Hatfield, Hertfordshire following the removal of the turntable.

== Preservation ==
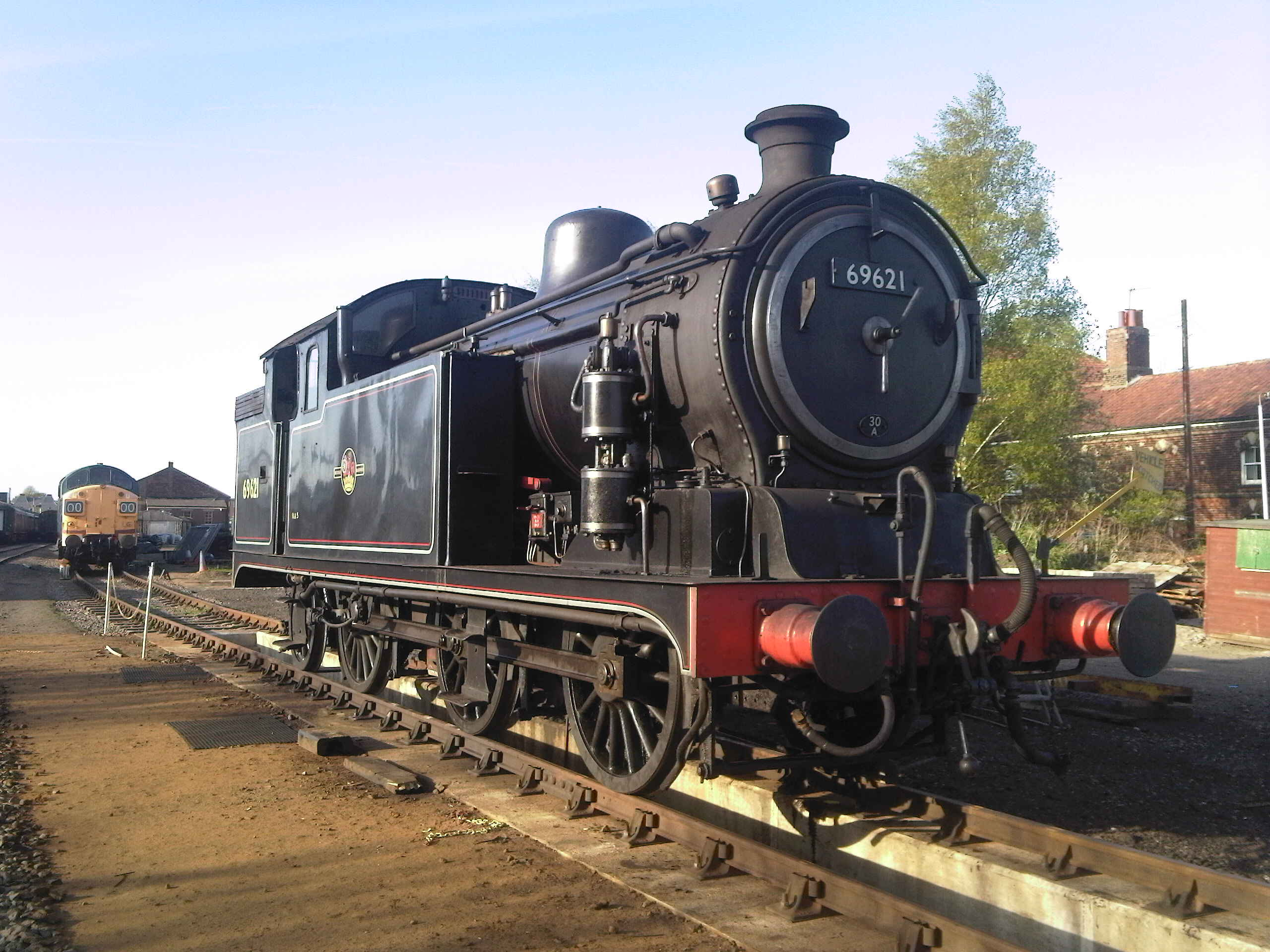
The preserved N7/4 No. 69621 (LNER 7999) at Dereham, Mid-Norfolk Railway, 2009

One LNER example, No. 7999 (BR No. 69621) has been preserved and is currently on static display pending overhaul at the East Anglian Railway Museum at Chappel & Wakes Colne. It is owned by the East Anglian Railway Museum. It was the last engine built by the Great Eastern Railway's Stratford Works in 1924 and was preserved in 1962. It was also named in honour of its designer A J Hill in 1989.
