= GER Class Y65 =

Class of British steam locomotives

GER Class Y65 LNER Class F7
Type and origin
- Power type: Steam
- Designer: S. D. Holden
- Builder: Stratford Works
- Build date: 1909–1910
- Total produced: 12
Specifications
- Configuration
  - Whyte: 2-4-2T
  - UIC: 1B1 n2t
- Gauge: 4 ft 8 1/2 in (1,435 mm)
- Leading dia.: 3 ft 6 in (1.067 m)
- Driver dia.: 4 ft 10 in (1.473 m)
- Trailing dia.: 3 ft 6 in (1.067 m)
- Length: 30 ft 11 in (9.42 m) over buffers
- Axle load: 14.15 long tons (14.38 t)
- Adhesive weight: 24.85 long tons (25.25 t)
- Loco weight: 45.70 long tons (46.43 t)
- Fuel capacity: 2.0 long tons (2.0 t)
- Water cap.: 1,000 imp gal (4,500 L; 1,200 US gal)
- Firebox
  - Grate area: 12.2 sq ft (1.13 m^{2})
- Boiler: LNER diagram 42
- Boiler pressure: 160 lbf/in^{2} (1.10 MPa)
- Heating surface
  - Firebox: 75.7 sq ft (7.03 m^{2})
  - Tubes: 797.2 sq ft (74.06 m^{2})
  - Total surface: 872 sq ft (81.0 m^{2})
- Cylinders: Two, inside
- Cylinder size: 15 in × 22 in (381 mm × 559 mm)
- Valve gear: Stephenson
- Valve type: Slide valves
- Loco brake: Westinghouse air
- Train brakes: Westinghouse air
Performance figures
- Tractive effort: 11,607 lbf (51.63 kN)
Career
- Operators: Great Eastern Railway; → London and North Eastern Railway; → British Railways
- Class: GER: Y65; LNER: F7
- Nicknames: Crystal Palace tanks
- Axle load class: LNER: Route availability 2, except Scotland: 1
- Withdrawn: 1931–1948
- Disposition: All scrapped

The GER Class Y65 was a class of twelve 2-4-2T steam locomotives designed by S. D. Holden and built by the company's Stratford Works in 1909–1910. They all passed to the London and North Eastern Railway at the 1923 grouping and received the classification F7.

== History ==
These locomotives were fitted with 15-by-22-inch (381 mm × 559 mm) cylinders and 4-foot-10-inch (1.473 m) diameter driving wheels. They were intended to displace the elderly E22 class 0-6-0T locomotives from their light branch line duties, but in the end, the E22s were the preferred locomotives for this work. They were all initially fitted with Westinghouse air brake equipment.

Table of orders and numbers
Year	Order	Builder	Quantity	GER Nos.	LNER Nos.	1942 No.	1946 No.	Notes
1909	Y65	Stratford Works	2	1300–1301	8300–8301	7593		
1909–10	A67	Stratford Works	10	1302–1311	8302–8311	7594–7598	7073–7094	

Between 1915 and 1921 four (1303–1305, 1309) were fitted for push-pull working using the compressed air system; these required the fitting of an extra Westinghouse pump to the side of the locomotives. In 1924, 8307 was also push-pull fitted using the mechanical system for use on the Great Central section; no extra pump was needed, but it did gain a vacuum ejector.

All had survived to pass to the LNER in 1923; the first retirement started in 1931 when four were withdrawn.

Three (8301/08/10) were sent to Scotland in 1931–32 and as a result of the move they had their Westinghouse air brake replaced with a steam brake and vacuum ejector.

The locomotives had large cabs, with large spectacle plate front and rear, which earned the nickname "Crystal Palace tanks"; those in Scotland were nicknamed "Tomato houses".

Withdrawals continued from 1938; six locomotives were left in 1942 when they were renumbered 7593–7598 in order to clear the 8300-block for new B1 class locomotives.

Two locomotives lasted long enough to be renumbered in the 1946 scheme; they became the property of British Railways in 1948, but both were withdrawn the same year without receiving their BR number.

Table of withdrawals
Year	Quantity in service at start of year	Quantity withdrawn	Locomotive numbers
1931	12	4	8302, 8306, 8309, 8311
1938	8	1	8300
1939	7	1	8303
1943	6	3	7593 (ex-8301), 7595 (ex-8305), 7596 (ex-8307)
1944	3	1	7594 (ex-8304)
1948	2	2	7093, (ex-7597, exx-8308) 7094 (ex-7598, exx-8310)
