= GER Class G69 =

Class of British locomotives

GER Class G69 LNER Class F6
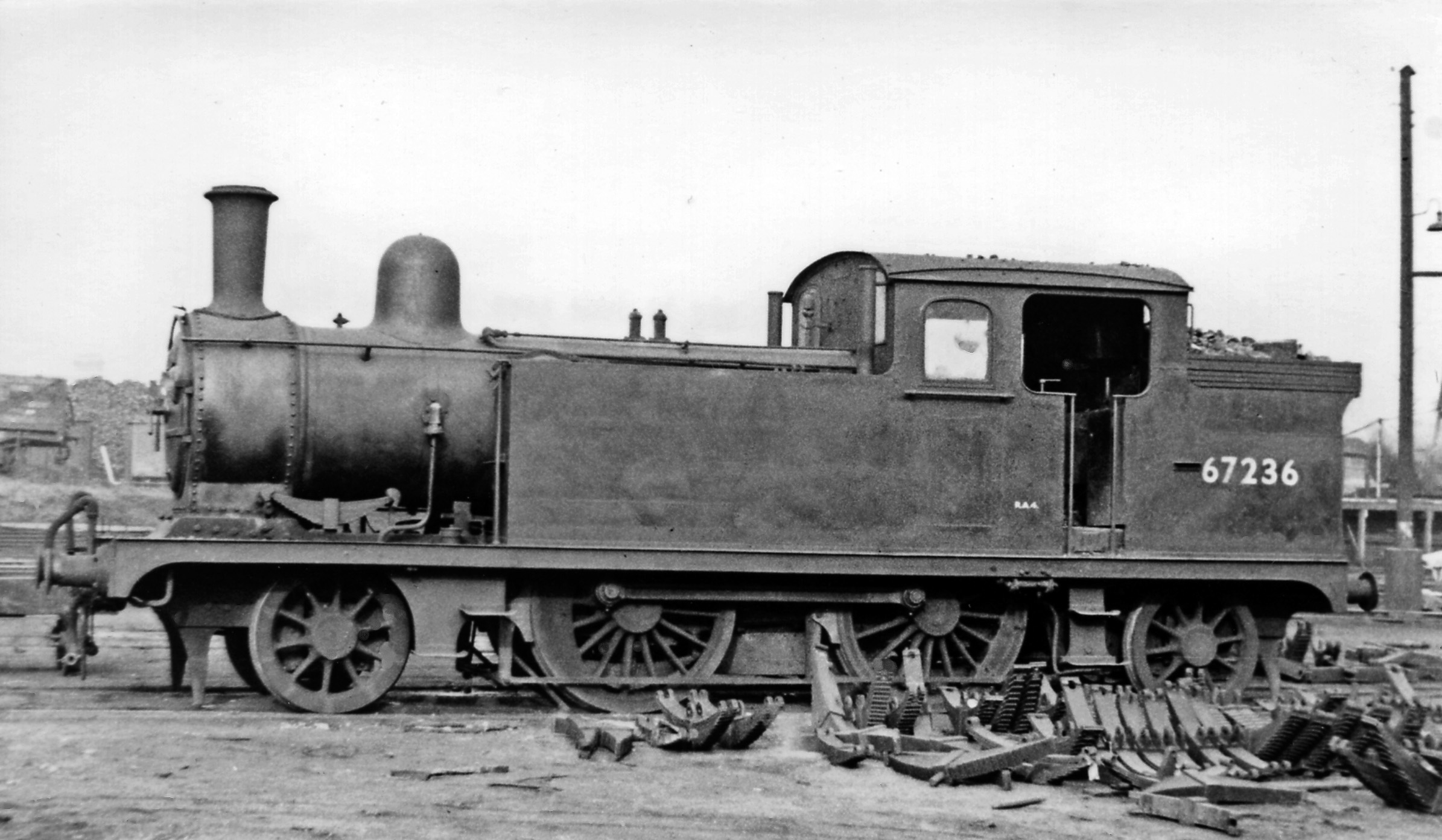
- No. 67236 at Cambridge Locomotive Depot February 1951
Type and origin
- Power type: Steam
- Designer: James Holden & S. D. Holden
- Builder: Stratford Works
- Build date: 1911–1912
- Total produced: 20 new, 2 rebuilt from M15
Specifications
- Configuration
  - Whyte: 2-4-2T
- Gauge: 4 ft 8 1/2 in (1,435 mm)
- Leading dia.: 3 ft 9 in (1.143 m)
- Driver dia.: 5 ft 4 in (1.626 m)
- Trailing dia.: 3 ft 9 in (1.143 m)
- Loco weight: 56 long tons 9 cwt (126,400 lb or 57.4 t)
- Fuel type: Coal
- Boiler pressure: 180 psi (1.24 MPa)
- Cylinders: Two, inside
- Cylinder size: 17 1/2 in × 24 in (440 mm × 610 mm)
Performance figures
- Tractive effort: 17,571 lbf (78.16 kN)
Career
- Operators: Great Eastern Railway; → London and North Eastern Railway
- Class: GER: G69; LNER: F6
- Withdrawn: 1955–1958
- Disposition: All scrapped

The GER Class G69 was a class of twenty 2-4-2T steam locomotives built by for the Great Eastern Railway by S. D. Holden in 1911–12 following the design of two rebuilt examples of the GER Class M15 designed by James Holden, his father, in 1904. They all passed to the London and North Eastern Railway at the 1923 grouping and received the classification F6.

== History ==
These locomotives were fitted with 17 1/2-by-24-inch (444 mm × 610 mm) cylinders and 5-foot-4-inch (1.626 m) wheels. They were the final development of the GER's radial 2-4-2T) tank locomotive. Being intended for London suburban service, they were built with condensing gear, and Westinghouse air brakes.

Table of orders and numbers
Year	Order	Manufacturer	Quantity	GER Nos.	LNER Nos.	1946 Nos.	Notes
1904	(D58)	Stratford Works	2	789–790	7789–7790	7218–7219	Rebuilt from class M15 in 1912
1911	G69	Stratford Works	10	61–70	7061–7070	7220–7229	
1911–12	A71	Stratford Works	10	1–10	7001–7010	7230–7239	

All were still in service at the 1923 grouping, the LNER adding 7000 to the numbers of nearly all the ex-Great Eastern locomotives, including the Class G69 locomotives. The LNER added vacuum ejectors to all but one locomotive in 1927; the one exception being fitted in 1929. They also removed the condensing apparatus between 1936 and 1938.

On 1 January 1923 the whole class was allocated to Stratford Engine Shed and were employed on suburban traffic in East London on the lines out of Fenchurch Street and Liverpool Street.

== 789 and 790 ==
Two of the GER M15 rebuilds, numbers 789 and 790, were given Class G69 cabs. This resulted in them being incorrectly classified, which affected their route availability. When the GER was amalgamated into the LNER in 1923 they were classified F6 (instead of F5). It wasn't until 22 December 1948 that the "twins", now numbered 67218 and 7219 respectively, were correctly reclassified into the F5 category. 7219 received her British Railways number in November 1949 after a general repair at Stratford.

== British Railways ==
At Nationalisation in 1948, British Railways added 60000 to their LNER numbers. They all continued in service until 1955, when the first was withdrawn; all were gone by May 1958, and none survived into preservation.

== New-build Project ==
As none of the F4s, F5s or F6s were preserved, The Holden F5 Steam Locomotive Trust is recreating GER number 789 from the beginning. As of November 2019, the frame plates, buffer beams, machined cylinder block, motion bracket, star stay, tank supports and buffer beams are awaiting assembly at Tyseley Locomotive Works. All wheels castings have been financed with delivery anticipated before the end of January 2020.

When completed, 789 is set to appear as the original locomotive did when rebuilt in 1912. Features include the high-arched G69-style cab, Ramsbottom safety valves, condensing gear, and the smaller (6/6.5 inch) Westinghouse air brake pump.

Table of withdrawals
Year	Quantity in service at start of year	Quantity withdrawn	Locomotive numbers	Notes
1955	20	10	67220, 67222–67223, 67226, 67232–67233, 67236–67239	
1956	10	4	67224–67225, 67234–67235	
1957	7	1	67221	
1958	5	5	67227–67231	
