= GER Class T77 =

Class of British steam locomotives (1916–1920)

GER Class T77 LNER Class J19
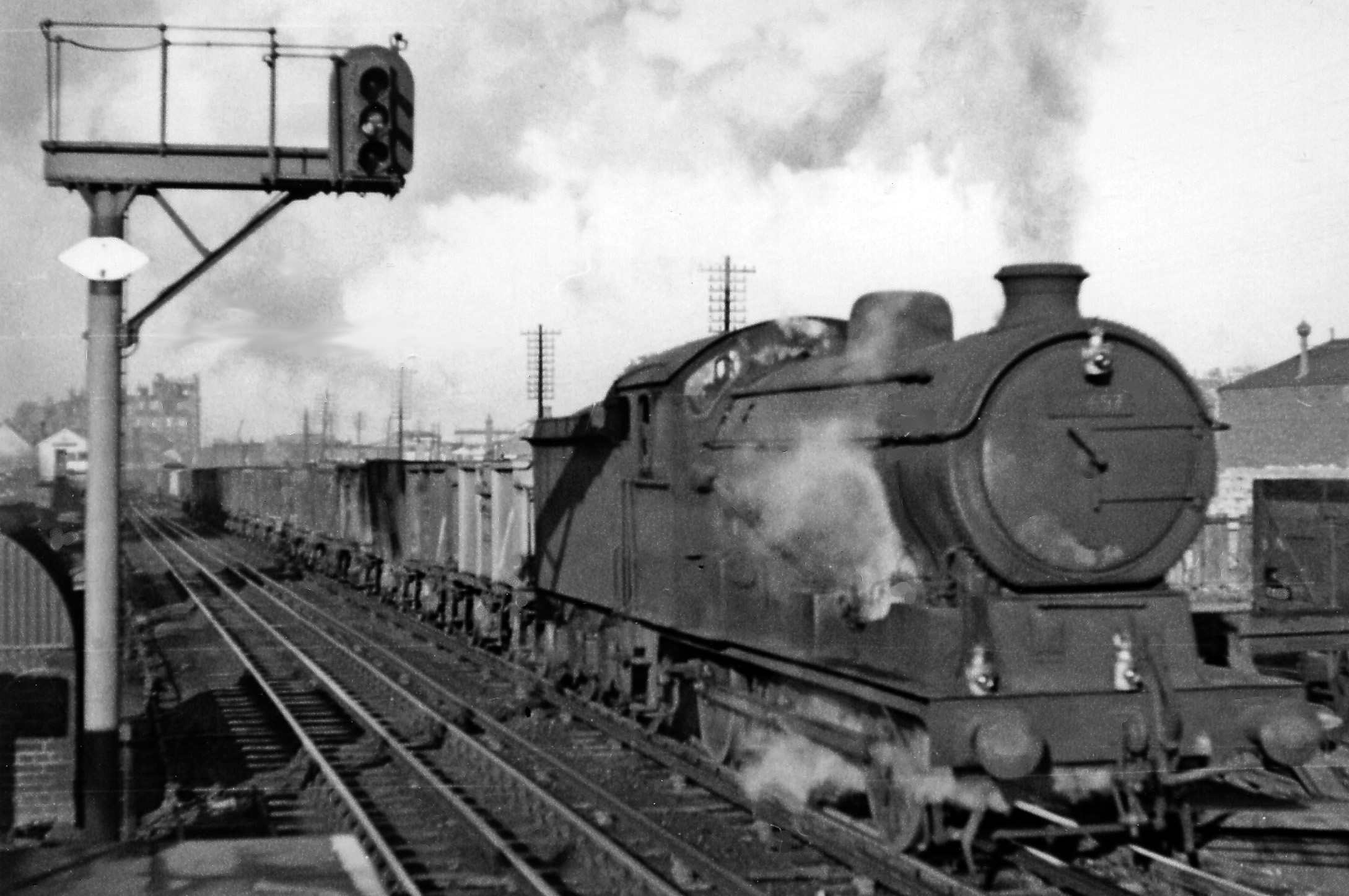
- Down (westbound) freight on the North London line at Finchley Road & Frognal. The train was probably from Temple Mills Yard (Leyton), heading for the SR with a Gresley rebuild of ex-GE J19 No. 64657. 7 May 1955
Type and origin
- Power type: Steam
- Designer: A. J. Hill
- Builder: Stratford Works
- Build date: 1916–1920
- Total produced: 25
Specifications
- Configuration
  - Whyte: 0-6-0
  - UIC: C h2
- Gauge: 4 ft 8 1/2 in (1,435 mm)
- Driver dia.: 4 ft 11 in (1.499 m)
- Wheelbase: 38 ft 7 in (11.76 m)
- Length: 52 ft 2 in (15.90 m) over buffers
- Loco weight: 47 long tons 7.5 cwt (106,100 lb or 48.1 t)
- Firebox
  - Grate area: 21.6 sq ft (2.01 m^{2})
- Boiler pressure: 160 lbf/in^{2} (1.10 MPa)
- Heating surface: 1,501.1 sq ft (139.46 m^{2})
- Cylinder size: 20 in × 28 in (508 mm × 711 mm)
- Valve gear: Stephenson
Performance figures
- Tractive effort: 25,817 lbf (114.84 kN)
Career
- Operators: Great Eastern Railway; → London and North Eastern Railway; → British Railways
- Class: GER: T77; LNER: J19
- Power class: BR: 5F
- Axle load class: LNER/BR: RA 5
- Withdrawn: 1959–1962
- Disposition: All scrapped

The GER Class T77 was a class of twenty-five 0-6-0 steam locomotives designed by A. J. Hill for the Great Eastern Railway. They all passed to the London and North Eastern Railway at the 1923 grouping and received the classification J19.

== History ==
These locomotives were a development of the GER Class E72, and shared the same 20-by-28-inch (508 mm × 711 mm) cylinders, 4-foot-11-inch (1.499 m) wheels, and Belpaire firebox-fitted boiler. Changes included vacuum brakes from new, and the abandonment of cylinder tail rods.

Table of orders and numbers
Year	Order	Manufacturer	Quantity	GER Nos.	LNER Nos.	1946 Nos.	Notes
1916–17	T77	Stratford Works	10	1140–1149	8140–8149	4650–4659	
1917–18	H80	Stratford Works	5	1260–1264	8260–8264	4660–4664	
1918–19	X80	Stratford Works	5	1265–1269	8265–8269	4665–4669	
1920	A81	Stratford Works	5	1250–1254	8250–8254	4670–4674	

All were still in service at the 1923 grouping, the LNER adding 7000 to the numbers of nearly all the ex-Great Eastern locomotives, including the Class T77 locomotives. Between 1934 and 1939 all were rebuilt with round-top fireboxes, and the cylinder bore was reduced to 19 inches (483 mm). The rebuilt locomotives were reclassified J19/2, while the yet-to-be rebuilt locomotives reclassified J19/1. The J19/2 classification also included the rebuilt former Class E72 locomotives.

At nationalisation in 1948, British Railways added 60000 to their LNER numbers. They all continued in service until 1959, when the first was withdrawn; all were gone by the end of 1962.

Table of withdrawals
Year	Quantity in service at start of year	Quantity withdrawn	Locomotive numbers	Notes
1959	25	8	64651/58/61–62/65/68/70/72	
1960	17	6	64650/54/56/59–60/63	
1961	11	7	64652–53/55/66–67/69/74	
1962	4	4	64657/64/71/73	
