= GER Class D81 =

Class of British 0-6-0 steam locomotives

GER Class D81 LNER Class J20
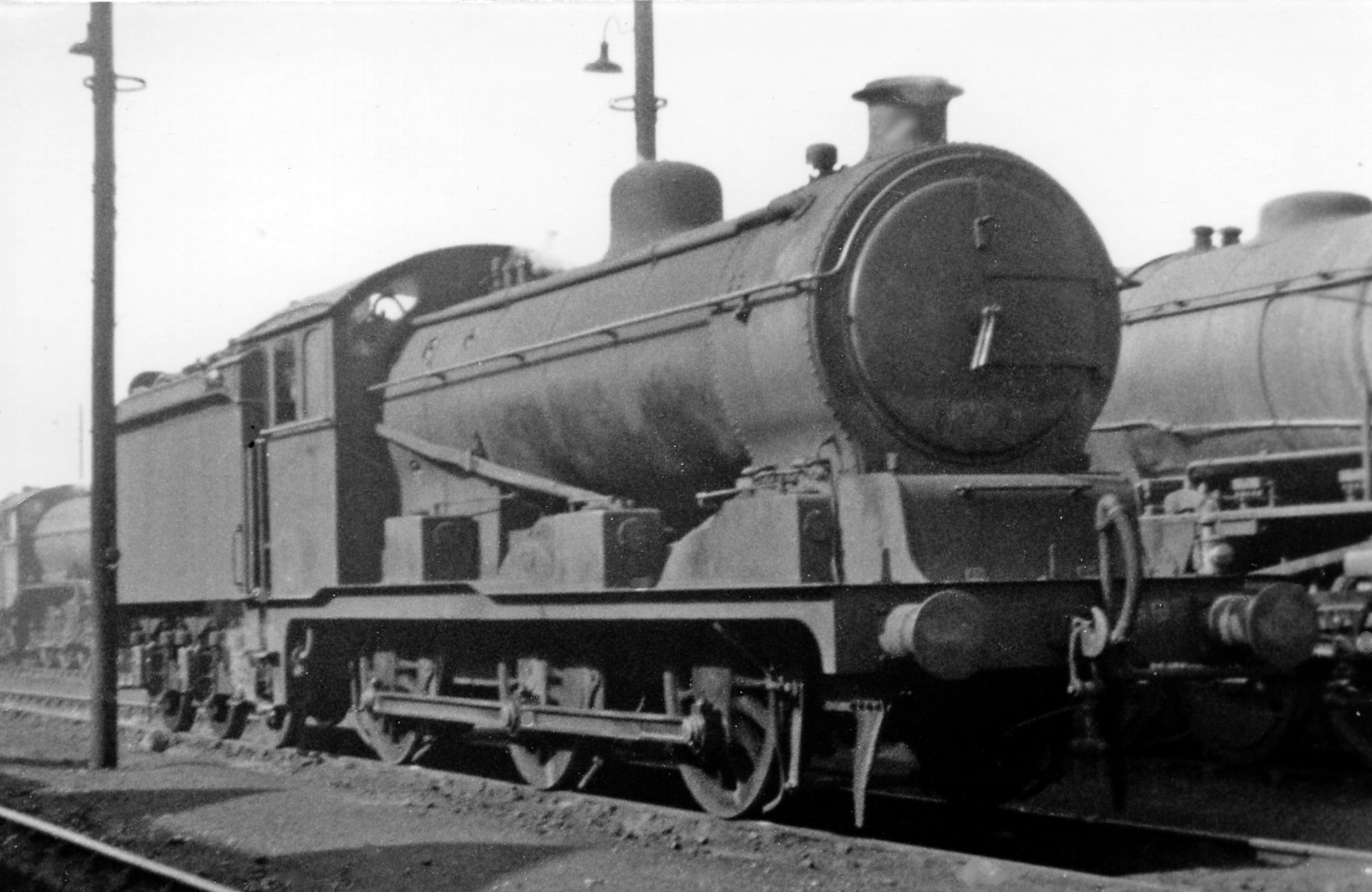
- J20 No. 4697 rests along with numerous other freight engines at March Locomotive Depot on Sunday 14 July 1946
Type and origin
- Power type: Steam
- Designer: A. J. Hill
- Builder: Stratford Works
- Build date: 1920–1922
- Total produced: 25
Specifications
- Configuration
  - Whyte: 0-6-0
  - UIC: C h2
- Gauge: 4 ft 8 1/2 in (1,435 mm)
- Driver dia.: 4 ft 11 in (1.499 m)
- Wheelbase: 40 ft 11 in (12.47 m)
- Length: 54 ft 6 in (16.61 m) over buffers
- Loco weight: 54 long tons 15 cwt (122,600 lb or 55.6 t)
- Fuel type: Coal
- Firebox
  - Grate area: 26.5 sq ft (2.46 m^{2})
- Boiler pressure: 180 lbf/in^{2} (1.24 MPa)
- Heating surface: 1,834.2 sq ft (170.40 m^{2})
- Cylinders: Two, inside
- Cylinder size: 20 in × 28 in (508 mm × 711 mm)
Performance figures
- Tractive effort: 29,044 lbf (129.19 kN)
Career
- Operators: Great Eastern Railway; → London and North Eastern Railway; → British Railways
- Class: GER: D81; LNER: J20
- Power class: BR: 5F
- Axle load class: LNER/BR: RA 5
- Withdrawn: 1959–1962
- Disposition: All scrapped

The GER Class D81 was a class of twenty-five 0-6-0 steam locomotives designed by A. J. Hill for the Great Eastern Railway. The all passed to the London and North Eastern Railway at the 1923 grouping and received the classification J20.

== History ==
These locomotives were fitted with 20-by-28-inch (508 mm × 711 mm) cylinders and 4-foot-11-inch (1.499 m) wheels, while the Belpaire firebox-fitted boiler was identical to that fitted to the Class S69 4-6-0s. They were the most powerful 0-6-0 tender locomotive in Britain until the arrival of Oliver Bulleid's Q1 class for the Southern Railway in 1942.

Table of orders and numbers
Year	Order	Manufacturer	Quantity	GER Nos.	LNER Nos.	1946 Nos.	Notes
1920	D81	Stratford Works	5	1270–1274	8270–8274	4675–4679	
1922	M87	Stratford Works	10	1275–1284	8275–8284	4680–4689	
1922	Y87	Stratford Works	10	1285–1294	8285–8294	4690–4699	

All were still in service at the 1923 grouping, the LNER adding 7000 to the numbers of nearly all the ex-Great Eastern locomotives, including the Class D81 locomotives. Between 1943 and 1956 the class was rebuilt with round-top fireboxes, and reclassified as J20/1.

At nationalisation in 1948, British Railways added 60000 to their LNER numbers. They all continued in service until 1959, when the first was withdrawn; all were gone by the end of 1962.

Table of withdrawals
Year	Quantity in service at start of year	Quantity withdrawn	Locomotive numbers	Notes
1959	25	3	64675/83/88	
1960	22	9	64678/81–82/84–86/93–95	
1961	13	8	64676–77/79–80/89/92/97–98	
1962	5	5	64687/90–91/96/99	
