= GER Class S69 =

Class of steam locomotives

GER Class S69 LNER Class B12
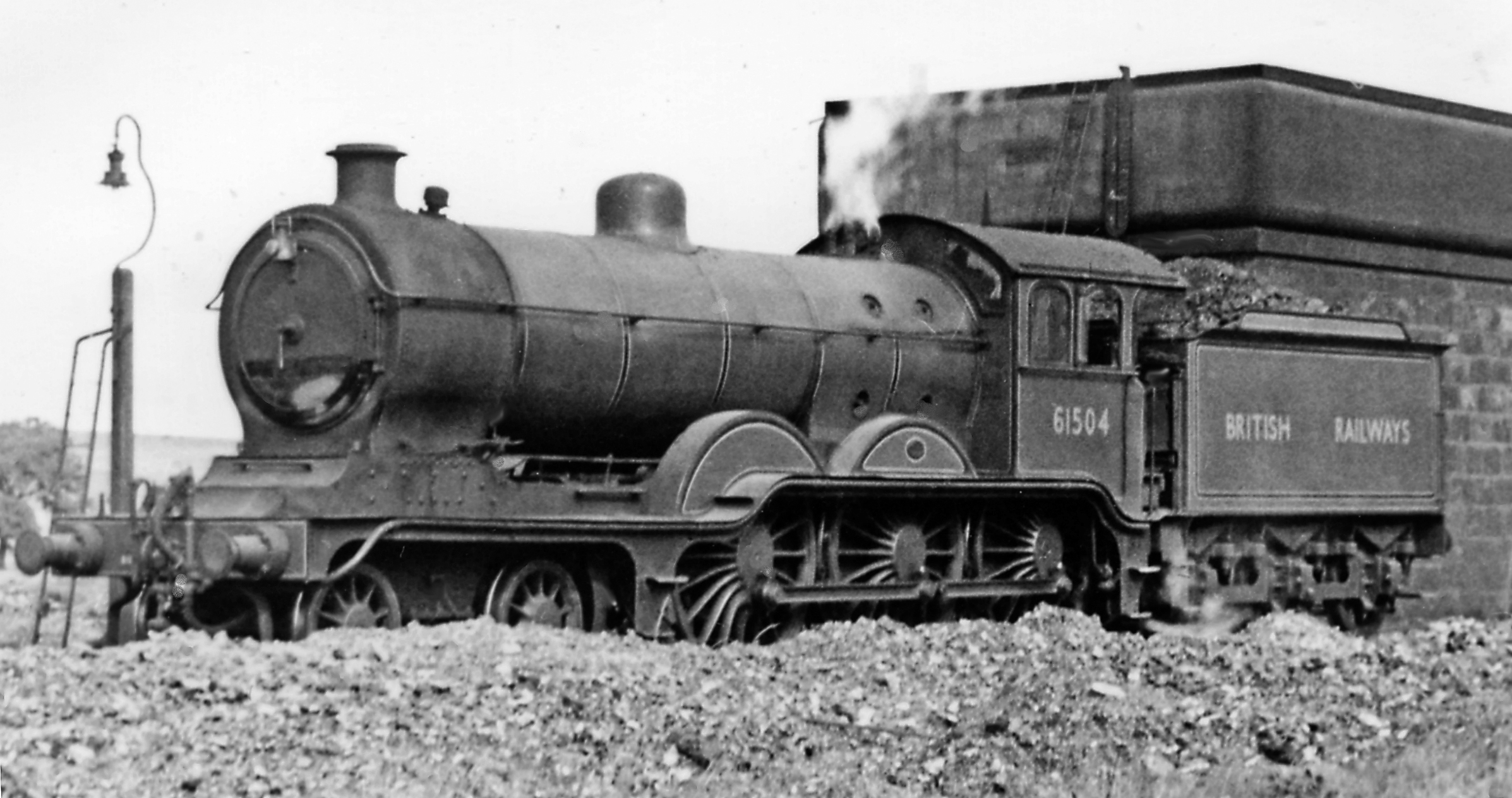
- B12/4 4-6-0 No. 61504 at Keith Locomotive Depot 1948
Type and origin
- Power type: Steam
- Designer: S. D. Holden
- Builder: Stratford Works (51), Wm. Beardmore & Co. (20), Beyer, Peacock & Co. (10)
- Serial number: WB 135–154, BP 6487–6496
- Build date: 1911–1921 (71) 1928 (10)
- Total produced: 81
Specifications
- Configuration
  - Whyte: 4-6-0
  - UIC: 2′C h2
- Gauge: 4 ft 8 1/2 in (1,435 mm) standard gauge
- Leading dia.: 3 ft 3 in (0.991 m)
- Driver dia.: 6 ft 6 in (1.981 m)
- Wheelbase: 48 ft 3 in (14.71 m)
- Length: 57 ft 7 in (17.55 m) over buffers
- Axle load: B12: 15 13/20 t (15,650 kg); B12/3: 17 t (17,000 kg)
- Adhesive weight: B12/1&2: 43 long tons 8 cwt (97,200 lb or 44.1 t); B12/3: 48 long tons 2 cwt (107,700 lb or 48.9 t)
- Loco weight: B12/1&2: 62 long tons 19.5 cwt (141,100 lb or 64 t); B12/3: 69 long tons 5 cwt (155,100 lb or 70.4 t)
- Tender weight: 38 long tons 6 cwt (85,800 lb or 38.9 t)
- Fuel type: Coal
- Fuel capacity: 4 long tons 0 cwt (9,000 lb or 4.1 t)
- Water cap.: 3,700 imp gal (16,800 L; 4,440 US gal)
- Firebox
  - Grate area: 26.5 sq ft (2.46 m^{2})
- Boiler pressure: 180 psi (1.24 MPa)
- Heating surface
  - Firebox: 154 sq ft (14.3 m^{2})
  - Total surface: 1,919 sq ft (178.3 m^{2})
- Cylinders: Two, inside
- Cylinder size: 20 in × 28 in (510 mm × 710 mm)
Performance figures
- Tractive effort: 21,969 lbf (97.72 kN)
Career
- Operators: Great Eastern Railway; → London and North Eastern Railway; → British Railways
- Class: GER: S69, LNER: B12
- Power class: BR: 4P3F
- Number in class: 81
- Numbers: GER/LNER 1946: 1500-1570, LNER: 8500-8580, BR: 61500-61580
- Axle load class: LNER/BR: RA 4 (B12/3), RA 3 (remainder)
- Withdrawn: 1913 (1), 1945–1961
- Disposition: One preserved, remainder scrapped

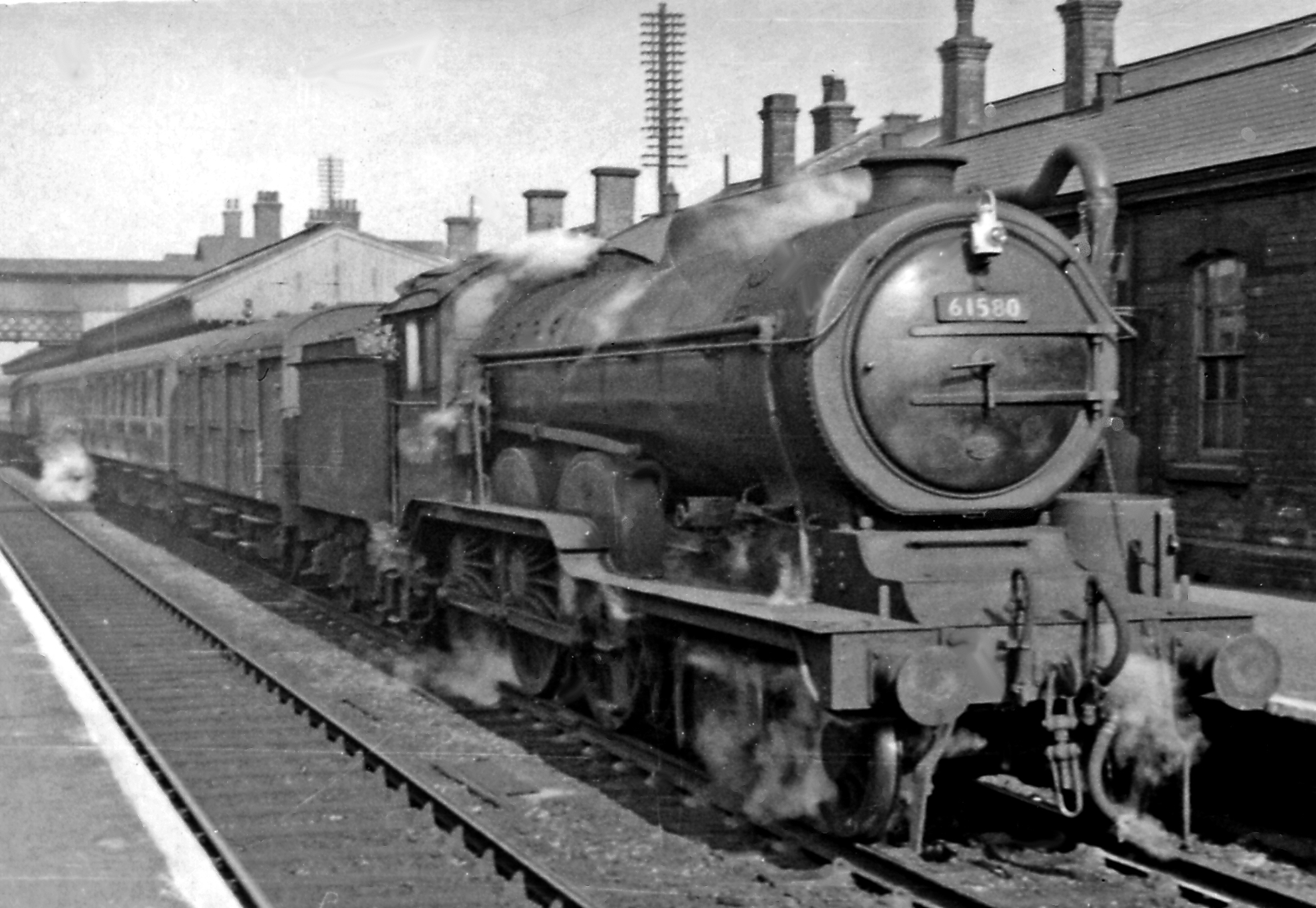
B12/3 No. 61580 at Grantham 28 March 1956.

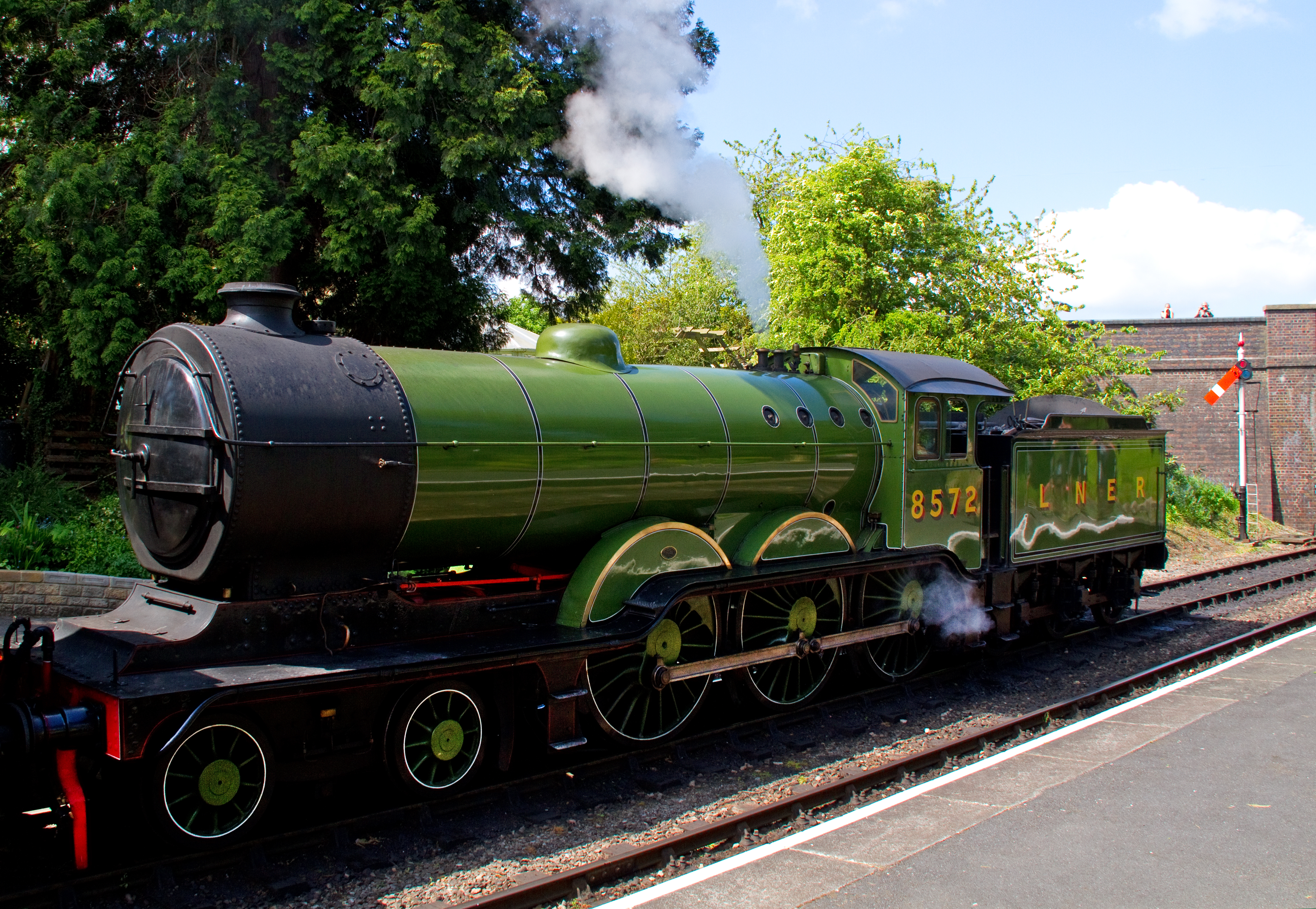
No. 8572 preserved

The Great Eastern Railway (GER) Class S69, also known as 1500 Class, and later classified B12 by the London and North Eastern Railway (LNER) is a class of 4-6-0 steam locomotive designed to haul express passenger trains from London Liverpool Street station along the Great Eastern Main Line. Originally they were designed by S. D. Holden, but were much rebuilt, resulting in several subclasses.

Seventy-one S69 locomotives were built between 1911 and 1921 and numbered 1500–1570. Fifty-one of these were built at the GER's Stratford Works and the remaining 20 by William Beardmore and Company. A further 10 locomotives were built by Beyer, Peacock and Company for the LNER in 1928 and numbered 8571–8580. From 1948 the British Railways numbers were 61500–61580 (with gaps).

== Background ==
At the time of their introduction, the "Claud Hamilton" 4-4-0s were becoming outclassed on the GER's heaviest express trains. Although an enlarged 4-4-0 design was mooted, it was realised that any such design would have too high an axle load for the tracks of the Great Eastern Railway, which had a relatively low restriction. Another design constraint was the short turntables used at the time. This meant that a 4-6-0 design was decided upon, although the design was relatively short compared to similar designs introduced at the same time.

== Construction ==
The first locomotive, numbered 1500, was delivered to Ipswich shed in November 1911, and construction continued at Stratford Works up to number 1538 which was delivered, again to Ipswich shed, in June 1915. There was then a brief pause due to wartime restrictions and the next two locomotives, 1539 and 1540, were not delivered until June 1917. A further batch of 20, numbers 1541 to 1560, were constructed by Beardsmore's having works numbers 135 to 154 although running numbers were not in the same order as the works numbers. These were delivered from June 1920 to April 1921 during which time construction continued at Stratford Works with numbers 1561 to 1570 also being delivered in 1920.

After the grouping the LNER ordered a further batch of 10 locomotives from Beyer Peacock of Manchester, and these were delivered with running numbers 8571 to 8580 to Gorton shed. This final batch brought the number of locomotives constructed to 81.

== LNER ==
Seventy were still in service at the 1923 grouping, the LNER adding 7000 to the numbers of nearly all the ex-Great Eastern locomotives, including the Class S69 locomotives. A further ten were ordered in 1928 to ease a power shortage caused by the stalled development on a new class of 4-6-0 locomotives, and the cancellation of the planned suburban 2-6-4T tank locomotive due to the adverse press publicity caused by the Sevenoaks derailment of 1927.

All the B12 locomotives were fitted with vacuum ejectors between 1924 and 1929 (the 1928 batch had them from new). Fifty-five locomotives were fitted with ACFI feedwater heaters between 1927 and 1934, but these were removed between 1934 and 1942. The first substantive change was the fitting of Lenz poppet valves to the 1928 batch (from new), and six of the ex-GE locomotives (8516/19/25/32/33/40). These locomotives were then classified as class B12/2. The poppet valves were not a great success and they all reverted to or were converted to piston valve engines between 1931 and 1934.

As newer power became available, the locomotives’ low axleload made them ideal candidates for transfers elsewhere. Consequently, between 1931 and 1942, twenty-five locomotives were transferred to Scotland for use on the former Great North of Scotland Railway lines.

Starting in 1932, a programme began of rebuilding the B12 locomotives with larger diameter boilers. The Diagram 99A boilers utilised were 5-foot-6-inch (1,676 mm) diameter, compared with the 5-foot-1 1/8-inch (1,553 mm) diameter originals. These rebuilt locomotives were classified as class B12/3, and as they had a higher axleload, none of the Scottish-allocated locomotives were included. The last to be rebuilt was 8549 in 1944, leaving 8534 as the last English B12/1; but it was withdrawn the following year without being rebuilt.

As the Scottish locomotives also required new boilers, a new design was started in 1941, based on the old design but with a round-topped firebox and other detail changes. Thirty of these Diagram 25A boilers were manufactured at Doncaster and Stratford between 1942 and 1946. Nine were sent to Inverurie Works for fitting to B12 locomotives, the remainder went to Stratford for fitting to class J20 locomotives. The B12 locomotives fitted with the Diagram 25A boiler (1500/04/05/07/08/11/24/26) were classified as class B12/4.

In the 1942 LNER renumbering scheme, the class was allocated the range 7415–7494, but only eleven (7426/37/49/67/70/72/76/79/82/88/91) were renumbered before the scheme was abandoned due to the war. In the 1946 scheme, the class was allocated the 1500–1580 block(their 1924 numbers with 7000 removed from them), with gaps for the two withdrawn locomotives.

== British Railways ==
At nationalisation in 1948, seventy-two locomotives passed to British Railways, who renumbered them 61500–61580. Withdrawals continued, and all were gone by the end of 1961. One engine, LNER No. 8572, has been preserved.

== Tables ==
Table of orders and numbers
| Year | Order | Manufacturer | Quantity | GER Nos. | LNER Nos. | LNER 1946 Nos. | Notes |
|---|---|---|---|---|---|---|---|
| 1911–12 | S69 | Stratford Works | 5 | 1500–1504 | 8500–8504 | 1500–1504 | |
| 1913 | A73 | Stratford Works | 10 | 1505–1514 | 8505, —, 8507–8514 | 1505, —, 1507–1514 | 1506 withdrawn after accident at Colchester, 12 July 1913 |
| 1913 | E75 | Stratford Works | 5 | 1515–1519 | 8515–8519 | 1515–1519 | |
| 1914 | R75 | Stratford Works | 10 | 1520–1529 | 8520–8529 | 1520–1529 | |
| 1914–15 | M77 | Stratford Works | 6 | 1530–1535 | 8530–8535 | 1530–1535 | |
| 1915–17 | B78 | Stratford Works | 5 | 1536–1540 | 8536–8540 | 1536–1540 | |
| 1920–21 | — | Wm. Beardmore & Co. 135–154 | 20 | 1541–1560 | 8541–8560 | 1541–1560 | |
| 1920 | H82 | Stratford Works | 10 | 1561–1570 | 8561–8570 | 1561–1570 | |
| 1928 | — | Beyer, Peacock & Co. 6487–6496 | 10 | — | 8571–8580 | 1571–1580 | 8572 preserved |

Table of withdrawals
| Year | Quantity in service at start of year | Quantity withdrawn | Locomotive numbers | Notes |
|---|---|---|---|---|
| 1945 | 80 | 1 | 8534 | Last English B12/1 |
| 1946 | 79 | 1 | 1548 | Scottish |
| 1947 | 78 | 6 | 1518/22/27/31/44/51 | 1531/51 Scottish |
| 1948 | 72 | 3 | 1500/09/17 | 1500 Scottish |
| 1949 | 69 | 2 | 1510/61536 | 61536 Scottish |
| 1950 | 67 | 2 | 61504/29 | Both Scottish |
| 1951 | 65 | 5 | 61503/15/25–26/59 | 61503/26 Scottish |
| 1952 | 60 | 5 | 61505/11/21/50/60 | All Scottish |
| 1953 | 55 | 9 | 61501/07–08/13/24/28/32/43/63 | All Scottish; last B12/4s |
| 1954 | 46 | 2 | 61502/39 | Last B12/1s, last Scottish B12s |
| 1955 | 44 | 2 | 61523/62 | |
| 1956 | 42 | 0 | – | |
| 1957 | 42 | 17 | 61512/19–20/37–38/40–41/45/50/55–57/65/69/74/78–79 | |
| 1958 | 25 | 9 | 61516/42/47/53–54/61/64/67/70 | |
| 1959 | 16 | 15 | 61514/30/33/35/46/49/58/66/68/71/73/75–77/80 | |
| 1960 | 1 | 0 | – | |
| 1961 | 1 | 1 | 61572 | Preserved |

== Accidents and incidents ==
- On 12 July 1913, locomotive No. 1506 was hauling an express passenger train which collided with GER Class T26 2-4-0 No. 471, at Colchester, Essex due to a signalman's error. Three people were killed and fourteen were injured. The brand new locomotive, only 4 months old, was so severely damaged that only its boiler and tender were salvaged. The remaining parts were cut up at Stratford Works in September of that year. A replacement locomotive was constructed, but this was allocated running number 1535 and number 1506 was not re-used.
- On 17 January 1931, locomotive No. 8578 was hauling a newspaper train that departed from Thorpe-le-Soken station, Essex against signals. It was in collision with LNER D16 4-4-0 No. 8781, which was undertaking a light engine move, at Great Holland. Two people were killed and two were seriously injured. After this accident the engine was given a general overhaul and received tender No. 20, which has originally built for the GER Decapod when it was converted to an 0-8-0 tender engine.
- On 10 February 1941, locomotive No. 8556 was hauling a passenger train that overran signals and was in a rear-end collision between Harold Wood and Brentwood, Essex. Seven people were killed and seventeen were seriously injured.
- On 2 January 1947, locomotive No. 1565 was hauling a passenger train that was run into by an express passenger train at Gidea Park, Essex. The express had overrun signals. Seven people were killed, 45 were hospitalised.

== World War II Career ==
An unknown number of B12 class locomotives were used towards the end of WWII to haul ambulance trains for the United States Army. These trains, equipped for working on the Continent or at home, were fitted with the Westinghouse brakes. The B12s were selected because they had the Westinghouse brakes, and were generally acceptable because their low-axle loading gave them a very high route-availability. They operated widely over the network and were fitted with a "vacuum/air proportioning valve" to allow the driver of a local pilot engine (used where double heading was necessary because of gradients) to control the brakes throughout the train.

== Preservation ==
One B12/3, LNER number 8572 (BR 61572), has survived to preservation on the North Norfolk Railway, the only British inside cylinder 4-6-0 to be preserved.

== Models ==
A model of the B12 was brought out in OO gauge by Tri-ang Railways (now Hornby) in 1963. Models produced since 1970 feature a steam "chuff" sound effect, where in the coal tender as the wheels turn, a piece of sand-paper is scraped by a piece of metal fixed to one wheel axle. In 2016, Hornby Railways launched a brand new tooling of the B12 in a super detail form with LNER Apple Green and BR Lined Black with early and late crest liveries.
