= GER Class M15 =

Class of British steam locomotives

GER Classes M15 and M15R LNER/BR Classes F4 and F5
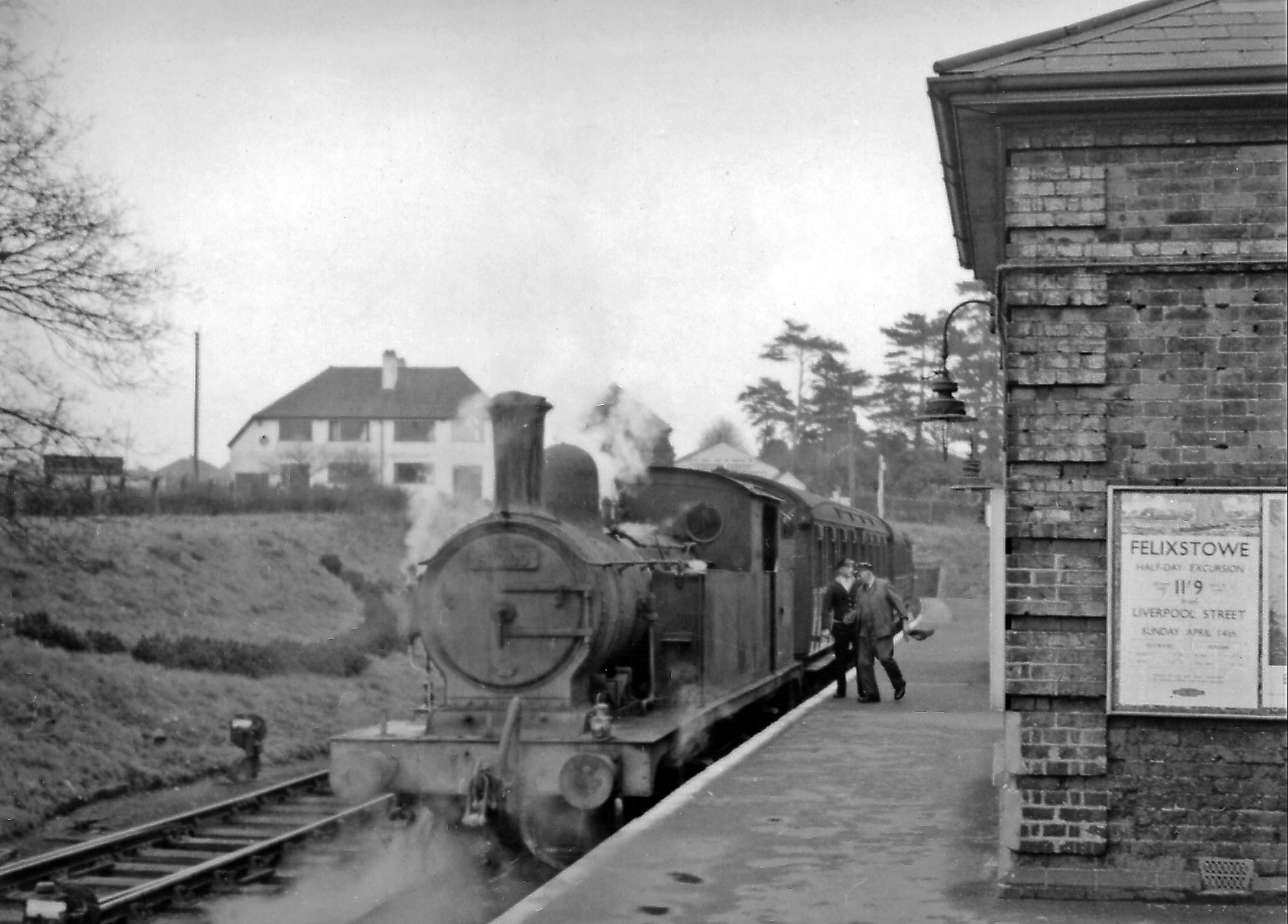
- No. 67200 at Ongar Station, March 1957
Type and origin
- Power type: Steam
- Designer: M15, Thomas William Worsdell; M15R, James Holden
- Builder: Stratford Works
- Build date: M15 built 1884-1909; M15r rebuilt 1911-1920
- Total produced: 160
Specifications
- Configuration
  - Whyte: 2-4-2T
- Gauge: 4 ft 8 1/2 in (1,435 mm)
- Leading dia.: 3 ft 9 in (1.143 m)
- Driver dia.: 5 ft 4 in (1.626 m)
- Trailing dia.: 3 ft 9 in (1.143 m)
- Wheelbase: 7 ft 6 in + 8 ft 0 in + 7 ft 6 in (23 ft 0 in total)
- Length: 34 ft 10 in (11 m)
- Loco weight: 53 long tons 19 cwt (120,800 lb or 54.8 t)
- Fuel type: Coal
- Firebox
  - Grate area: M15/F4 98.4 sq. ft. M15R/F5 96.7 sq. ft.
- Boiler pressure: M15/F4, 160 psi (1.10 MPa); M15R/F5, 180 psi (1.24 MPa)
- Heating surface
  - Tubes: M15/F4 1018.0 sq. ft. M15R/F5 1018.0 sq. ft.
- Cylinders: Two, inside
- Cylinder size: 17.5 in × 24 in (440 mm × 610 mm)
- Valve gear: M15/F4, Joy valve gear M15R/F5, Stephenson valve gear
Performance figures
- Tractive effort: M15/F4, 15,618 lbf (69.47 kN); M15R/F5, 17,571 lbf (78.16 kN)
Career
- Operators: GER » LNER » BR
- Class: GER: M15 and M15R. LNER/BR: F4 and F5. (7789/7218 and 7790/7219 LNER: F6, BR: F5)
- Numbers: GER M15s 650-679, 780-800, 140-149, 91-111, 232-244, 572-591, 211-225, 170-189, 71-80. BR F4 67151-67187; F5 67188-67219
- Nicknames: Gobblers
- Locale: East London, Hertfordshire, Essex, East Anglia
- First run: M15 July 1884; M15R June 1903
- Last run: F4 June 1956; F5 May 1958
- Withdrawn: M15s/F4s 1913-1937, 1943-1956; F5s 1955–1958
- Disposition: All original locomotives scrapped; one new-build under construction

The GER Class M15 was a class of 160 2-4-2T steam locomotives designed by Thomas William Worsdell and built for the Great Eastern Railway between 1884 and 1909. The original (F4) class of locomotives were fitted with Joy valve gear which was notoriously difficult to 'set'. This earned them the nickname of 'Gobblers' thanks to their high coal consumption rates. As a result, between 1911 and 1920, 32 of them were rebuilt by James Holden with Stephenson valve gear and higher pressure boilers. Despite this, the nickname stuck for many years after.

== Rebuilding ==
Rebuilding included the fitting of a higher pressure boiler, and also involved replacing Joy valve gear with Stephenson valve gear thus forming the M15R class.

== Modifications ==
Many were fitted with condensing gear for working in the London area. In 1949 seven F5s were fitted with vacuum-controlled regulators, converted from Westinghouse air brake to steam brake, and fitted with push-pull apparatus and trip cock gear for branch line operation. (67199 was never fitted with trip cock gear). Five of these locomotives worked trains on the line between Epping and Ongar, two (numbers 67199 and 67218) were allocated to Yarmouth for working the Yarmouth-Beccles line. 67218 would later be transferred to Epping in 1955. These seven received British Railway lined-black passenger livery; the rest were unlined-black.

== Ownership ==
=== London and North Eastern Railway ===
One-hundred-and-eighteen M15s and all thirty-two M15rs (including numbers 789 and 790, the two locomotives that were rebuilt with GER Class G69 cabs), passed into London and North Eastern Railway (LNER) ownership at the 1923 grouping. The number 7000 was added to the ex-GER fleet. They received the following classifications:

- Unrebuilt (M15) locomotives: F4.
- Rebuilt (M15R) locomotives: F5.
- Numbers 7789 and 7790 were incorrectly classified F6. British Railways reclassified both of them F5 on 22 December 1948.

On 1 January 1923 the majority of the class were allocated to Stratford Engine Shed and were employed on suburban traffic in East London on the lines out of Fenchurch Street and Liverpool Street. The table below shows where they were allocated and includes the two examples erroneously allocated as F6 by the LNER:-

Location	F4	F5	F6
Cambridge	1	-	-
Colchester	2	1	-
Ipswich	1	2	-
Lowestoft	2	-	-
Norwich	2	-	-
Parkeston	1	-	-
Stratford	109	27	2
Totals	118	30	2

During World War 2 in 1940 a number of the class were taken out of service and had armoured plating added. They were then deployed on armoured trains, not only in their native East Anglia (Westerfield, Mistley and Tilbury), but in Kent, Lincolnshire and as far north as Aberdeen. They were also found at Ministry of Defence depots in the west of the country (Bicester, Long Marston and Wooton Dassett. By 1943 they were being returned to the LNER and were later fitted with brass plaques commemorating their role. These read - "LNER - during the war of 1939-1945 this locomotive was armoured and hauled defence trains on coast lines".

=== British Railways ===
Thirty-seven F4s and all of the F5s, including 7218 and 7219 (ex-7789 and 7790), passed into British Railways (BR) ownership in 1948. Their BR numbers were:

- Class F4: 67151-67187. (Fifteen of these F4s were allocated BR numbers but never carried them).
- Class F5: 67188-67219

== Withdrawal ==
Ten of the original series of forty engines constructed between 1884-87 were withdrawn in Great Eastern days, between September 1913 and December 1922. F4 withdrawals continued until 1937, and then again from 1943 to June 1956 when the last one, number 67157, was withdrawn from Kittybrewster. The F5 class remained intact until 1955 but withdrawal then proceeded rapidly, and they finally became extinct in May 1958.

=== Preservation ===
None of the F4s or F5s survived into preservation. However, a project to build a working replica of F5 number 789 was launched in the early 2000s. The project is based at Tyseley for erection and construction work. The completed locomotive (originally set to appear as 67218 in BR Black) is to be outshopped as No.789 in Great Eastern Railway blue livery.
