= GER Classes S46, D56 and H88 =

Three related classes of 121 British 4-4-0 locomotives

GER S46, D56 and H88 "Claud Hamilton" LNER Class D14/D15/D16
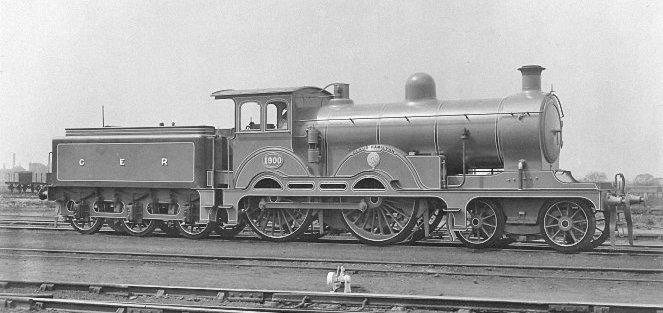
- GER No. 1900 shortly after its completion in 1900.
Type and origin
- Power type: Steam
- Designer: James Holden and A. J. Hill
- Builder: Stratford Works
- Build date: 1900-1923
- Total produced: 121
Specifications
- Configuration
  - Whyte: 4-4-0
  - UIC: 2′B n2, 2′B h2
- Gauge: 4 ft 8 1/2 in (1,435 mm)
- Leading dia.: 3 ft 9 in (1.14 m)
- Driver dia.: 7 ft (2.1 m)
- Length: 53 ft 4 3/4 in (16.275 m)
- Loco weight: 52.2–55.9 long tons (53.0–56.8 t)
- Fuel type: Coal
- Firebox
  - Grate area: 21.3 sq ft (1.98 m^{2})
- Boiler pressure: 180 psi (1,200 kPa)
- Cylinders: Two inside
- Cylinder size: 19 in × 26 in (480 mm × 660 mm)
Performance figures
- Tractive effort: 17,095 lbf (76,040 N)
Career
- Operators: Great Eastern Railway; → London and North Eastern Railway; → British Railways
- Power class: BR: 2P (3P for D16/3 from 1953)
- Axle load class: LNER/BR: RA 5
- Withdrawn: D15: 1948–1952; D16/2: 1950-1952; D16/3: 1945-1953, 1955-1960
- Disposition: All scrapped.

The GER Classes S46, D56 and H88 (classified Classes D14, D15, and D16 by the London and North Eastern Railway) were three classes of similar 4-4-0 steam locomotive designed by James Holden (S46 and D56) and A. J. Hill (H88) for the Great Eastern Railway.

They were given the nickname Claud Hamilton after the pioneer engine of the class, named after Lord Claud Hamilton (1843–1925) the chairman of the Great Eastern Railway. The D56 class of 1903-4 evolved the design to include a square-topped Belpaire firebox. The H88 class of 1923 featured a larger superheated boiler, leading them to be known as Super Clauds. Many earlier members of the class were rebuilt during their working life.

During the Edwardian era, they were the flagship express locomotive on the Great Eastern Main Line, and although displaced on the heaviest express trains by the larger S69 class from 1911 (itself a 4-6-0 development of the Claud design), members of the class were used on passenger and goods services throughout the Eastern Region until 1960. No locomotives of the three classes survived to preservation.

== Design ==
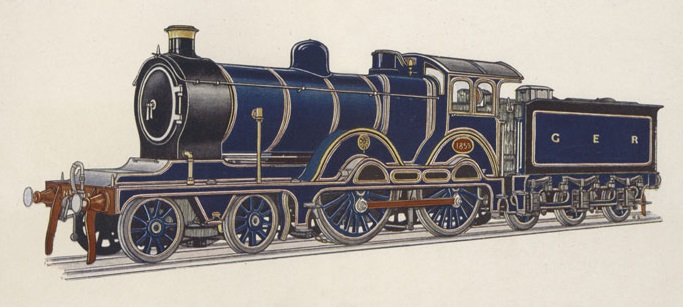
GER Class D56 in original Great Eastern blue livery with decorative features as depicted in a 1910 colour plate by W.J. Stokoe (note the square Belpaire firebox).

The Claud Hamilton, particularly in its original GER blue livery, is widely considered one of the most elegant locomotive designs of the pre-grouping era.

In his 1955 history of the Great Eastern Railway, Cecil J. Allen devotes a whole chapter to the class and noted that

Of all the locomotive designs that emerged from Stratford Works during the reign of James Holden, the one destined to achieve the greatest fame, beyond question, was his Claud Hamilton type 4-4-0, of which the pioneer example, No. 1900 Claud Hamilton, took the rails in 1900.

Although credited to James Holden, the Locomotive Superintendent of the Great Eastern, Frederick Vernon Russell (Holden's Chief Designer) is thought to have contributed substantially to the design of the Claud Hamiltons; while researching his Some Classic Locomotives of 1949, C.H. Ellis was informed by Russell that during the process of designing the locomotive "Mr Holden, by then a valetudinarian was making a long recuperative stay in Egypt."

The 4-4-0 inside cylinder locomotive included a number of features that were to appear on later Great Eastern locomotive classes, including a circular polished steel smokebox door surround (instead of the usual horizontal straps) and decorative splashers. Class pioneer No 1900 Claud Hamilton featuring red lining and connecting rods, copper chimney cap and GER coat of arms was much admired when it was exhibited at the 1900 Paris Exposition.

The original S46 boiler had 1,630 sq ft (151 m^{2}) of heating surface, with a 21.3 sq ft (1.98 m^{2}) grate. The cylinders were 19 x 26 in. with flat valves placed below, operated by Stephenson's motion. The coupled wheels were 7 ft (2.1 m) in diameter.

As built, the S46s were all fired by oil, using Holden's patented oil-burning apparatus which used a bed of fire brick, a supply of air fed from a pre-heater in the smokebox and steam-powered injectors which sprayed atomised oil onto the firebed. The firebox was heated, and steam for the injectors initially generated, by burning coal before switching to oil. The oil burnt was a waste product of the GER's gasworks that produced Pintsch gas for lighting its carriages. The GER had previously been fined for discharging this waste product into the River Lea, and the railway was thus able to fuel its oil-burning locomotives at little extra cost.

The first ten of the D56 types were also built as oil-burners, but during the 1900s the increasing use of electric lighting in carriages and growing industrial demand for fuel oil meant that it was no longer cost-effective to use it as a locomotive fuel. Holden had always intended that his oil-burning system would allow locomotives so fitted to be easily converted to burn coal if required, and all the S46s and D56s had been switched to coal-burning by the end of 1911. When oil prices were low or coal was in short supply due to strike action some examples were re-fitted to burn oil for short periods but this was not done past 1927.

Allen reports that Claud Hamiltons in their original state were capable of taking around 350 tons from Liverpool Street to North Walsham in under the booked time. No. 1882 with round-top boiler ran the 130.2 miles (209.5 km) in 156 min 60 sec. Even heavier trains were managed in the up direction: No. 1809 (Belpaire boiler) took 400 tons up in 157 minutes 24 seconds.

The S46 design was substantially modified in later incarnations, particularly with the introduction of a larger superheated boiler on the H88 designed by Alfred John Hill. Most earlier members of the class were substantially modified by Hill or during the tenure of Sir Nigel Gresley as CME of the LNER from 1923.

Two separate classes were also developed from the design of the Claud Hamilton; Holden's Class F48 (constructed between 1900 and 1903) was essentially an 0-6-0 goods version of the S46 and the Class S69 (built between 1911 and 1921) was a larger 4-6-0 version using many of the same design cues as the H88, built to replace the Clauds on the heaviest express trains.

== Classification and numbering ==
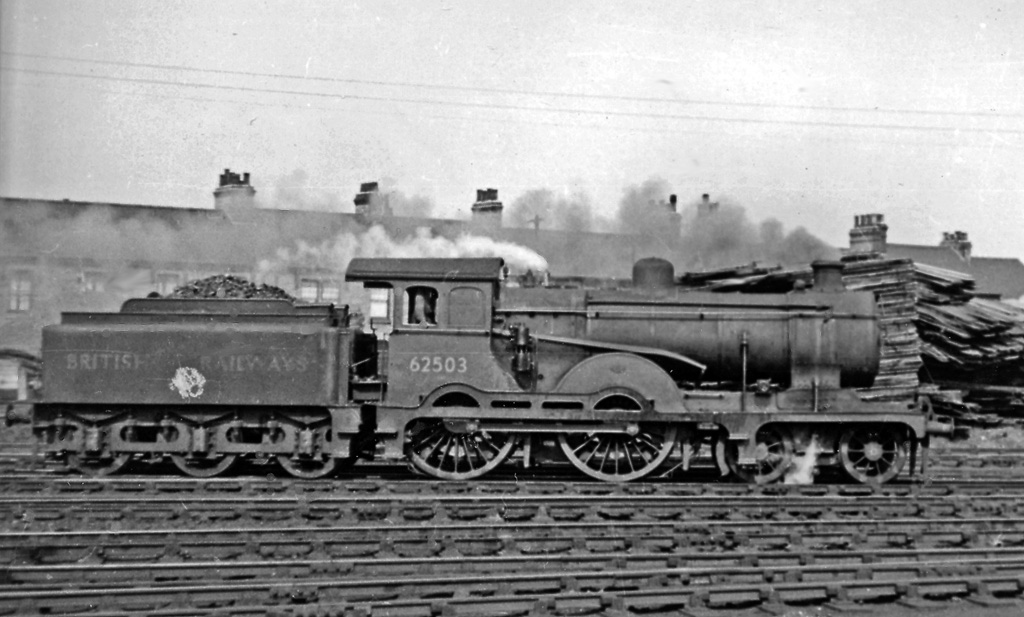
Class D15 No. 62503 at Cambridge Shed in August 1949. Note the cut-out splashers and small 'water-cart' tender.

The classification of the Claud Hamiltons is complex but is summarised here:

- GER Class S46 (LNER Class D14), 4 ft 9 in diameter boiler, round-top firebox
- GER Class D56 (LNER Class D15), 4 ft 9 in diameter boiler, Belpaire firebox
  - LNER Class D15/1, D15 as built with short smokebox, some with superheater
  - LNER Class D15/2, D15 with superheater and long smokebox
- GER Class H88 (LNER Class D16), "Super Claud" with superheater, larger boiler (5 ft 1 1/8 in diameter) and Belpaire firebox
  - LNER Class D16/1, D16 as built (with short smokebox)
  - LNER Class D16/2, as D16/1 but with extended smokebox
  - LNER Class D16/3, Gresley rebuild of D15 and D16 with round-top firebox, some with piston valves

The class pioneer was numbered 1900 (to coincide with the year the locomotive was built), with subsequent batches numbered backwards in tens as follows:

Table of orders and numbers
Year	Order	Quantity	GER Nos.	LNER Nos.	1942 Nos.	1946 Nos.	Notes
1900	S46	1	1900	8900	7770	2500	
1900	L47	10	1890–1899	8890–8899	7760–7769	2501–2510	
1901	M51	10	1880–1889	8880–8889	7750–7759	2511–2520	
1902	F53	10	1870–1879	8870–8879	7740–7749	2521–2530	
1903	L55	10	1860–1869	8860–8869	7730–7739	2531–2540	
1903–04	D56	10	1850–1859	8850–8859	7720–7729	2541–2550	Belpaire boiler
1906–07	G61	10	1840–1849	8840–8849	7710–7719	2551–2560	
1908	A64	10	1830–1839	8830–8839	7700–7709	2561–2570	
1909	B66	10	1820–1829	8820–8829	7690–7699	2571–2580	
1910	D67	10	1810–1819	8810–8819	7680–7689	2581–2590	
1910	P67	10	1800–1809	8800–8809	7670–7679	2591–2600	
1911	E69	10	1790–1799	8790–8799	7660–7669	2601–2610	
1923	H88	10	1780–1789	8780–8789	7650–7659	2611–2620	Never carried GER numbers in service

The Railway Magazine of November 1923 includes the log of a run from Liverpool Street to Ipswich with 4-4-0 number 1780, so this loco at least must have carried a GER number.

== Appearance ==
Claud Hamiltons were originally painted in GER Royal Blue with red lining, red side rods, brass highlights, and "G E R" in shaded letters on the tender; the standard livery for GER passenger locomotives at the time.

Starting in 1915 due to World War I, the GER was forced to keep all its locomotives in a grey undercoat with minimal black lining, with large, unshaded yellow locomotive numbers painted on the tenders in 1921. GER Royal Blue would never return to the railway, and the grey livery was kept as late as the 1930s with certain engines.

With the 1923 Grouping, the GER amalgamated with other railways to create the London and North Eastern Railway, and the Claud Hamiltons were progressively painted in the company's standard Apple Green livery, with "L & N E R" (later "L N E R") in shaded letters on the tender and the locomotive number underneath as well as on the cab. Side rods were polished steel. The fitting of larger boilers and Belpaire fireboxes across subclasses resulted in changing cab window shapes as well.

However, in 1929, the Claud Hamiltons were demoted to the LNER Lined Black livery with red lining and cab-side numbers only in the interests of economy. Only three locomotives retained LNER Apple Green post-1929: "Royal Clauds" Nos. 8783 and 8787, being kept in immaculate condition with copper-capped chimneys and white cab roofs as dedicated Royal locos for hauling the Royal Train from King's Cross to Wolferton (the nearest station for Sandringham House); and class pioneer No. 8900 Claud Hamilton when it was rebuilt as a D16/3 in 1933.

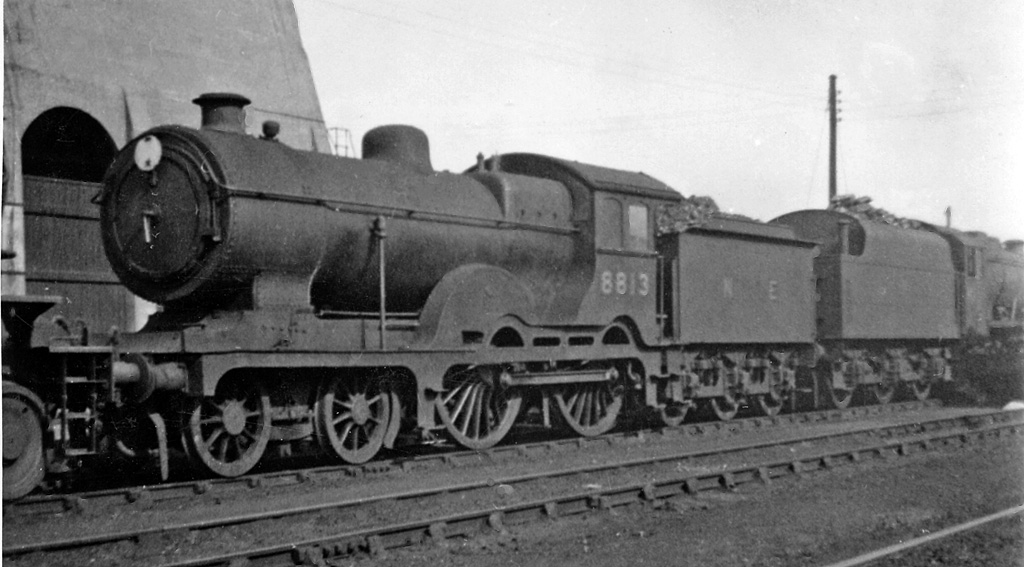
D16/2 'Super-Claud' No. 8813 in disguised wartime 'NE' black livery at March Locomotive Depot 14 July 1946.

During World War II, all the Claud Hamiltons were repainted into unlined black livery from 1941. 1942 saw a mass locomotive renumbering scheme across the LNER, and the letters on the tender were shortened to "N E". "L N E R" would return in 1946 alongside another mass renumbering scheme, but this time both were in unshaded Gill Sans font. The unlined black livery was kept, with the only exception being No. 8783, returning to LNER Apple Green.

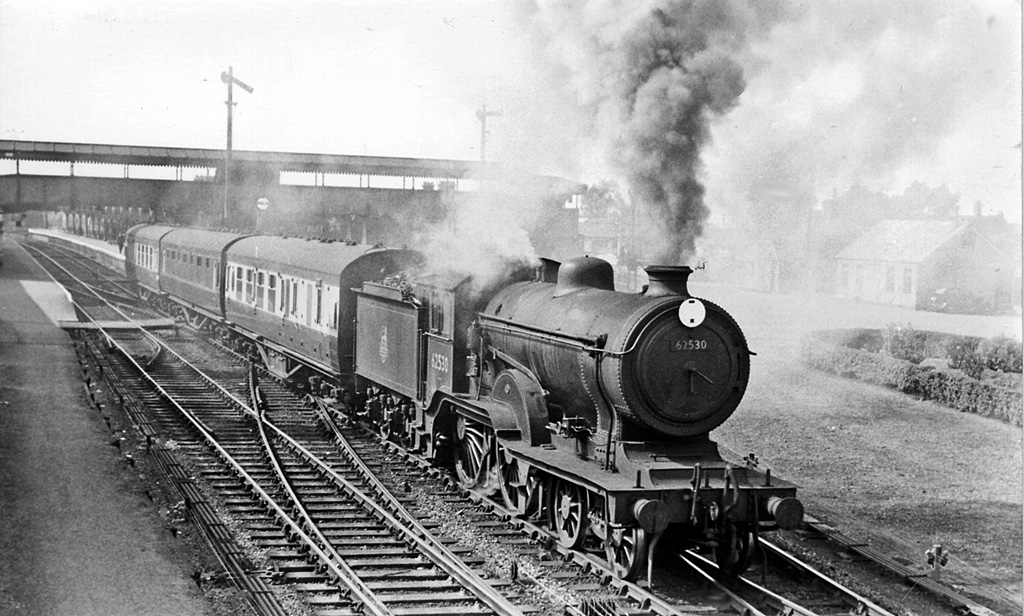
D16/3 'Super Claud' 4-4-0 No. 62530 departs March in August 1958.

After the formation of British Railways in 1948, the Claud Hamiltons were renumbered for a final time, with a prefix of 6- added to their 1946 locomotive number and numberplates fastened onto the smokebox door. Most D16/2s and D16/3s were repainted into the BR Lined Black livery with red and white lining, whereas the remainder joined all but one of the D15/2s in unlined black. In 1949, No. 62618 (formerly No. 8787) rejoined its "Royal Claud" sister No. 62614 (formerly No. 8783) in being painted apple green with retrofitted BR numbers, number plates, and early BR crests. Both locomotives would revert to BR Lined Black in 1951 and 1952, respectively. "BRITISH RAILWAYS" was painted on the tender from 1948, followed by the early BR crest from 1949 and the late BR crest from 1956. Many locomotives had their decorative valances removed in later years as well, though they still retained their distinctive character.

== Accidents and incidents ==
- On 1 January 1915, locomotive No. 1813 was hauling an express passenger train that overran signals and collided with a local passenger train at Ilford, Essex. Ten people were killed and more than 500 were injured.
- On 12 February 1927, locomotive No. 8808 was hauling an express passenger train that was in collision with a lorry on a level crossing at Tottenham, London. Due to foggy conditions, the train was not travelling at a high speed.
- On 17 January 1931, locomotive No. 8781 was running light engine at Great Holland, Essex when it was in a head-on collision with a newspaper train, which was being hauled by LNER Class B12 4-6-0 No. 8578 . Two people were killed and two were seriously injured. The newspaper train had departed from Thorpe-le-Soken station against signals.
- On 27 November 1934, D15/2 No. 8896 locomotive was derailed at Wormley, Hertfordshire when it collided with a lorry on a level crossing. Both engine crew were killed.
- On 1 June 1939, locomotive No. 8783 was hauling a passenger train that collided with a lorry on an occupation crossing at Hilgay, Norfolk and was derailed.

== Withdrawals ==
Withdrawals of the class began in 1945, with the final member, a D16/3, scrapped in 1960 leaving no survivors of the class.

Table of withdrawals
Year	Quantity in service at start of year	Quantity withdrawn	Locomotive numbers	Notes
1945	121	1	8866	Not renumbered
1946	120	2	2550/95	
1947	118	1	2500	Name transferred to 2546
1948	117	6	2504/60/63/83, 2600/02	
1949	111	1	2594	
1950	110	3	62508/12/91	
1951	107	7	62501/03/05/20/28/47, 62603	
1952	100	8	62502/06–07/09/27/38/90/98	
1953	92	2	62581, 62616	
1954	90	0	–	
1955	90	15	62525/31/36/41/49/52/54/57/59/73–74/79/85, 62607/20	
1956	75	8	62523/32/42/51/67/69/77/87	
1957	67	28	62510/14/16/19/26/33/35/39/46/48/53/56/58/62/65/75–76/78/84/93/96, 62601/05/08–09/11/17/19	
1958	39	23	62513/15/18/21–22/30/34/43/45/55/61/64/66/68/72/80/86/88/92/99, 62610/14–15	
1959	16	12	62511/17/29/40/44/70–71/82/89, 62606/12/18	
1960	4	4	62524/97, 62604/13	

== Revival ==
A group based at the Whitwell & Reepham railway planned to build a replica of D16/2 No. 8783 to be named Phoenix. Steam Railway magazine reported that the project was discontinued in 2024, with project chairman Dan Knights citing a combination of a lack of funding (the group had raised £2,500 of a projected cost of £1.5 million to complete the locomotive) and the discovery that there were few usable engineering drawings for the internal motion of the class as contributing factors.

== In fiction ==
The design was the basis of the character Molly in the children's TV series Thomas the Tank Engine and Friends.

== Bibliography ==
- Aldrich, C. Langley (1969). The Locomotives of the Great Eastern Railway 1862–1962 (7th ed.). Wickford, Essex: C. Langley Aldrich. OCLC 30278831.
- Allen, Cecil J. (November 1923). "British Locomotive Practice and Performance". The Railway Magazine. Vol. 53, no. 313. pp. 385–400.
- Allen, Cecil J. (1955). The Great Eastern Railway (1st ed.). Shepperton: Ian Allan. OCLC 12240779.
- Baxter, Bertram (2012). Baxter, David; Mitchell, Peter (eds.). British Locomotive Catalogue 1825–1923. Vol. 6: Great Eastern Railway, North British Railway, Great North of Scotland Railway, Midland & Great Northern Joint Railway, remaining companies in the LNER group. Southampton: Kestrel Railway Books. ISBN 978-1-905505-26-5.
- Earnshaw, Alan (1990). Trains in Trouble: Vol. 6. Penryn: Atlantic Books. ISBN 0-906899-37-0.
- Earnshaw, Alan (1991). Trains in Trouble: Vol. 7. Penryn: Atlantic Books. ISBN 0-906899-50-8.
- Ellis, C.H. (1942). "Famous locomotive engineers: No. 20 James Holden". Locomotive Carriage and Wagon Review. 47: 110–115.
- Ellis, C.H. (1949). Some classic locomotives. London: George Allen & Unwin.
- Ellis, C.H. (1965). The splendour of steam. London: George Allen & Unwin. ISBN 0-04-385016-2.
- Fry, E.V.; Hoole, Ken; Manners, F.; Neve, E.; Proud, P.; Yeadon, W.B. (August 1981). Fry, E.V. (ed.). Locomotives of the LNER. Part 3C. Tender engines—classes D13 to D24. Kenilworth: Railway Correspondence & Travel Society. ISBN 0-901115-52-5.
- Jenkinson, David; Edgington, John; Smart, John (1994). The Big Four in Colour, 1935-50. Penryn: Atlantic Books. ISBN 0-906899-62-1.
- Trevena, Arthur (1980). Trains in Trouble. Vol. 1. Redruth: Atlantic Books. ISBN 0-906899-01-X.
- Vaughan, Adrian (1989). Obstruction Danger. Wellingborough: Patrick Stephens Limited. ISBN 1-85260-055-1.
