= Globe Road & Devonshire Street railway station =

Former railway station in England

Globe Road & Devonshire Street
- Interactive map of Globe Road & Devonshire Street

General information
- Location: Globe Town
- Local authority: London Borough of Tower Hamlets
- Owner: Great Eastern Railway
- Number of platforms: 2

Key dates
- 1884: Opened
- 1916: Closed

Other information
- Coordinates: 51°31′32″N 0°02′57″W

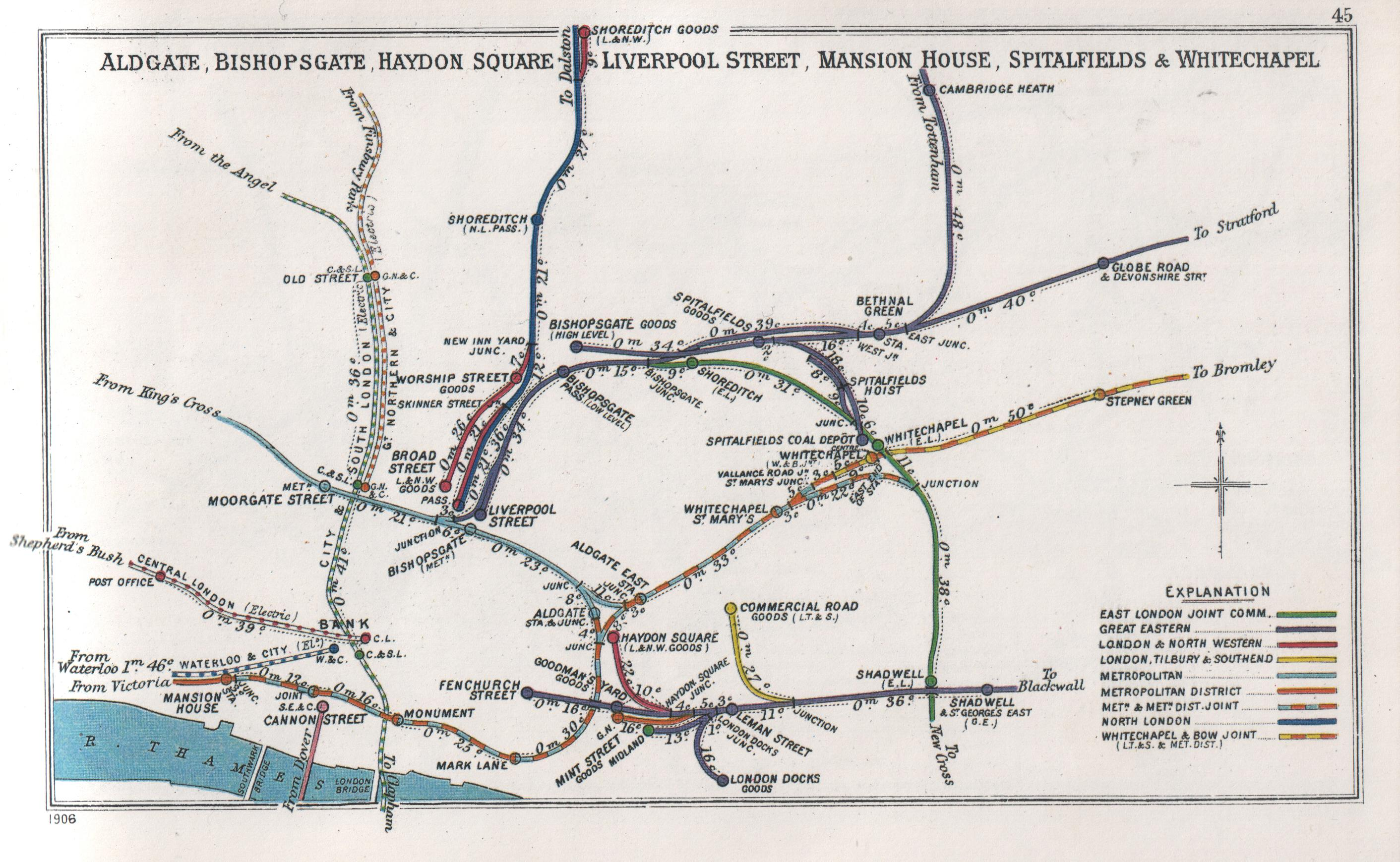
Map of inner east London railways in 1906, showing Globe Road & Devonshire Street on the Liverpool Street to Stratford line

Globe Road & Devonshire Street was a railway station on the Great Eastern Main Line, 1 mile 54 chains (2.7 km) down the line from Liverpool Street. It was opened by the Great Eastern Railway on 1 July 1884 when the company quadrupled the double-track main line section, and it was situated close to the site of the former Devonshire Street terminus, which had closed in 1840.

The station had two platforms which were served by the newly constructed line. The platforms were situated on a railway viaduct and the booking office was at street-level at the London-end in Globe Road. Passengers' comfort was provided in first and second-class waiting rooms, first and second-class ladies waiting rooms, a drinking fountain, and toilets. There was also a second booking office in Devonshire Street.

There were two signal boxes sited near the station, at Globe Street Junction and Devonshire Street, when it opened, although the former box closed in 1894 with the Devonshire Street box taking over its duties.

Competition from Stepney Green station on the Underground District line and wartime constraints (notably staff shortages) led to the closure of Globe Road & Devonshire Street station on 22 May 1916 and it never re-opened. At that time, many inner London stations were closed, including two nearby, Bishopsgate and Coborn Road; there are now no intermediate stations between Liverpool Street and Stratford.

The station was demolished in May 1938. Nothing remains of it today. Devonshire Street after which the station was named was later incorporated into the northern part of Bancroft Road.

== Goods yards ==
There were a number of sidings opened by the Eastern Counties Railway in 1850 used for goods traffic. There was a short spur line off here that ran parallel with the adjacent Regent's Canal and allowed coal to be dropped directly in barges. These sidings lasted until the 1980s being used for sand traffic (and known at this point as Mile End Sidings). They were still in situ in 2013 although no regular traffic has used the yard for some years.

There was also a goods yard adjacent to Globe Road & Devonshire Street station at ground level (the station being on a viaduct at this point) which was built in 1880. Accessed by a steep ramp from the main line the yard was initially worked by horses but c1876 GER Class 209 0-4-0ST locomotives worked the yard. Subsequently these were replaced by small GER Class B74 (LNE classification Y4) 0-4-0T locomotives in 1914. There was also a coal yard south of the railway linked to the goods yard with a line through the viaducts carrying the main line.

Although heavily bombed in World War II (staff reputedly had to jump in the adjacent canal to avoid fire on one occasion), the yard remained operational until 1967. Traffic known to have been handled in the yard included coal, fruit and apparently it was the only London goods depot to accept fish for manure purposes.

In 1956 the steam shunting locomotives were replaced by Ruston & Hornsby diesels but these proved unpopular. In January 1960 the Rustons were replaced by a Brush built demonstrator shunter carrying the number 100. The locomotive proved popular at Devonshire Street and in September 1960 it was classified as British Rail Class D2/11, renumbered D2999 and remained there until 15 October 1967. (Note: Another member of this class is preserved at the Middleton Railway as of January 2020 and carries the number D2999.)

The lower yard closed in 1967.

== See also ==
- List of closed railway stations in London

== Sources ==
- Butt, R. V. J. (October 1995). The Directory of Railway Stations: details every public and private passenger station, halt, platform and stopping place, past and present (1st ed.). Sparkford: Patrick Stephens Ltd. ISBN 978-1-85260-508-7. OCLC 60251199. OL 11956311M.

Preceding station	Historical railways	Following station
Bethnal Green	Great Eastern Railway; Great Eastern Main Line	Coborn Road
