= GER Class C53 =

Class of British locomotives

GER Class C53; LNER Class J70
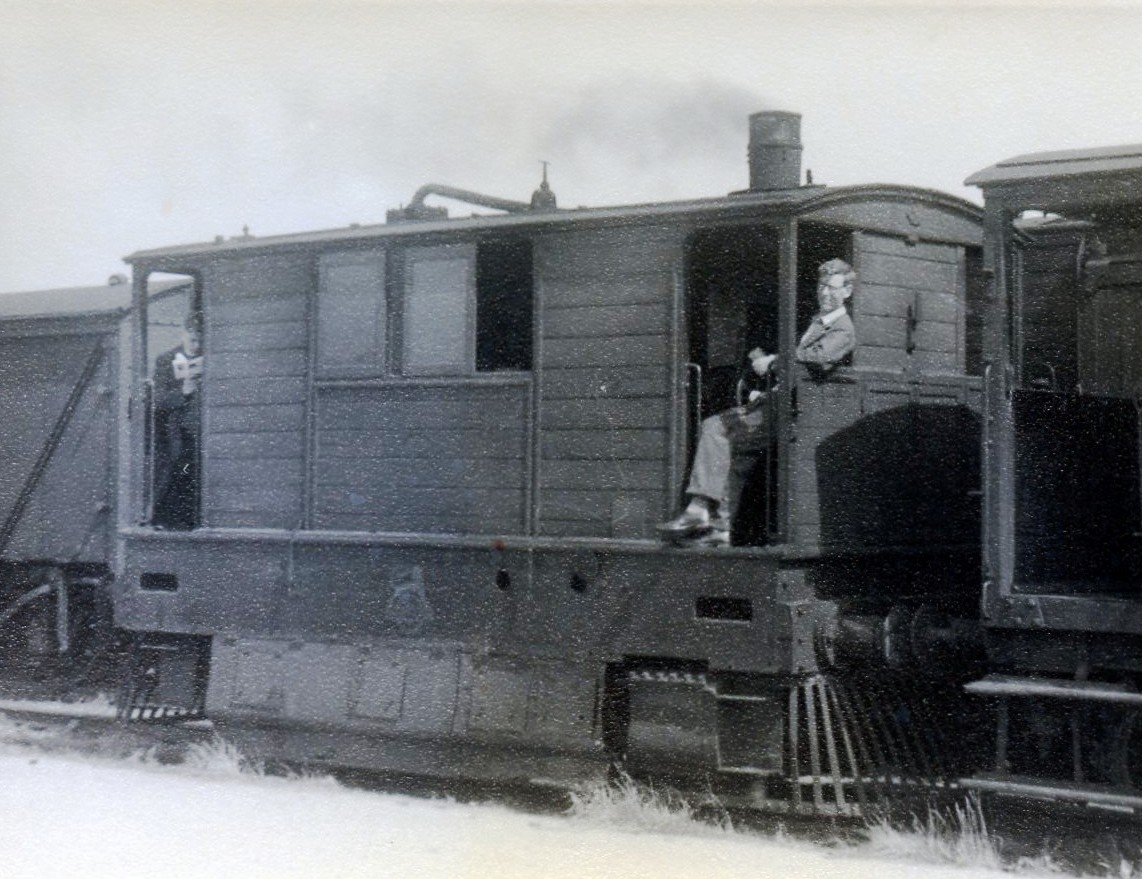
- J70 68222 at Upwell in 1952
Type and origin
- Power type: Steam
- Designer: James Holden
- Builder: Stratford Works
- Build date: 1903 – 1921
- Total produced: 12
Specifications
- Configuration
  - Whyte: 0-6-0T
  - AAR: Co
  - UIC: C n2t
- Gauge: 4 ft 8 1/2 in (1,435 mm) standard gauge
- Coupled dia.: 3 ft 1 in (0.940 m)
- Wheelbase: 6 ft 8 in (2.032 m)
- Length: 20 ft 8 3/8 in (6.309 m)
- Axle load: 11 long tons 7 cwt (25,400 lb or 11.5 t)
- Loco weight: 27 long tons 1 cwt (60,600 lb or 27.5 t)
- Fuel type: Coal
- Fuel capacity: 15 long cwt (1,700 lb or 800 kg)
- Water cap.: 625 imp gal (2,840 L; 751 US gal)
- Firebox
  - Type: Round-top
  - Grate area: 9.2 sq ft (0.9 m^{2})
- Boiler
  - Diameter: 2 ft 10.5 in (0.9 m)
  - Tube plates: 6 ft 10 in (2.1 m)
  - Small tubes: 102 x 1.625 in (41.3 mm)
- Boiler pressure: 180 lbf/in^{2} (1.24 MPa)
- Heating surface
  - Firebox: 42.08 sq ft (3.9 m^{2})
  - Tubes: 306 sq ft (28.4 m^{2})
  - Total surface: 348.08 sq ft (32.3 m^{2})
- Cylinders: Two, outside
- Cylinder size: 12 in × 15 in (305 mm × 381 mm)
- Valve gear: Walschaerts
Performance figures
- Tractive effort: 8,931 lbf (39.73 kN) at 85%
Career
- Operators: Great Eastern Railway; London and North Eastern Railway; British Railways
- Class: GER: C53; LNER: J70
- Power class: BR: 0F
- Axle load class: LNER/BR: RA 2
- Withdrawn: 1942 (1), 1949–1955
- Disposition: All original C53s scrapped, one Toby the Tram Engine replica built at East Anglian Railway Museum.
- Most specifications from

The GER Class C53 was a class of 12 0-6-0T steam tram locomotives designed by James Holden for the Great Eastern Railway. They passed to the London and North Eastern Railway at the grouping and received the LNER classification J70.

== History ==
The locomotives had 12-by-15-inch (305 mm × 381 mm) outside cylinders driving 3-foot-1-inch (0.940 m) wheels, all enclosed by skirting. They were the first locomotives on the Great Eastern to use Walschaerts valve gear. From the 1930s to the 1950s, they were used on the Wisbech and Upwell Tramway and the ports of Great Yarmouth and Ipswich. They replaced earlier GER Class G15 0-4-0T that had a similar appearance.

Table of orders and numbers
Year	Order	Builder	Quantity	GER No.	LNER No.	LNER 1946 No.	Notes
1903	C53	Stratford Works	2	135–136	7135–7136	8216–8217	
1908	C64	Stratford Works	3	137–139	7137–7139	8218, —, 8219	GER No.138 was withdrawn in 1942
1910	I67	Stratford Works	1	130	7130	8220	
1914	P75	Stratford Works	3	127–128, 131	7127–7128, 7131	8221–8223	
1921	D85	Stratford Works	3	125–126, 129	7125–7126, 7129	8224–8226	

The first withdrawal was in 1942. The remaining 11 locomotives were renumbered 8216–8226 in 1944 and passed to British Railways in 1948 on nationalisation, after which the prefix "6" was added to their numbers. Withdrawals restarted in 1949, slowly at first, then more quickly. The last went in 1955.

Table of withdrawals
Year	Quantity in service at start of year	Quantity withdrawn	Locomotive numbers
1942	12	1	7138
1949	11	1	68218
1951	10	1	68221
1952	9	1	68224
1953	8	4	68216–7/19–20
1955	4	4	68222–3/25–6

== Individual locomotives ==
List of GER C53 locomotives
GER number	LNER number	1946 number	BR number	Build date	Withdrawal date
135	7135	8216	68216	31/10/1903	31/12/1953
136	7136	8217	68217	30/11/1903	31/03/1953
137	7137	8218	68218	30/09/1908	30/09/1949
138	7138	N/A	N/A	30/09/1908	31/01/1942
139	7139	8219	68219	31/10/1908	31/08/1953
130	7130	8220	68220	30/04/1910	31/03/1953
127	7127	8221	68221	30/06/1914	21/05/1951
128	7128	8222	68222	30/06/1914	28/02/1955
131	7131	8223	68223	30/06/1914	19/07/1955
125	7125	8224	68224	31/03/1921	30/04/1952
126	7126	8225	68225	31/03/1921	31/03/1955
129	7129	8226	68226	31/03/1921	02/08/1955

Note: The data above is according to the website RailUK. Another website, BRDatabase, gives some different dates:

- GER No. 135 was withdrawn on 30 November 1953
- GER No. 136 was withdrawn on 9 March 1953
- GER No. 130 was withdrawn on 23 February 1953
- GER No. 128 was withdrawn sometime in January 1955
- GER No. 125 was withdrawn on 24 March 1952
- GER No. 126 was withdrawn on 8 March 1955

== In fiction ==
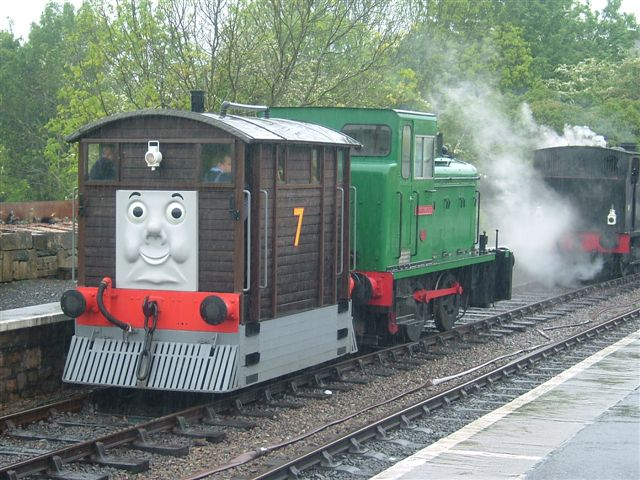
A Toby replica on the Avon Valley Railway

J70 68221 was the inspiration for the character Toby the Tram Engine in The Railway Series by the Rev. W. Awdry, and its television series adaptation, Thomas & Friends.

== See also ==
- GER Class G15
