= GER Class G15 =

British steam locomotive class (1883–1952)

GER Class G15 LNER Class Y6
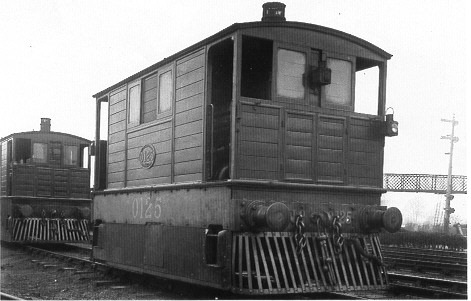
- GER Class G15 No. 0125
Type and origin
- Power type: Steam
- Designer: Thomas William Worsdell
- Builder: Stratford Works
- Build date: 1883–1897
- Total produced: 10
Specifications
- Configuration
  - Whyte: 0-4-0T
  - UIC: Bn2t
- Gauge: 4 ft 8 1/2 in (1,435 mm)
- Driver dia.: 3 ft 1 in (0.940 m)
- Loco weight: 21 long tons 5 cwt (47,600 lb or 21.6 t)
- Fuel type: Coal
- Fuel capacity: 0 long tons 10 cwt (1,100 lb or 0.5 t)
- Water cap.: 500 imp gal (2,270 L; 600 US gal)
- Firebox
  - Grate area: 9.7 sq ft (0.90 m^{2})
- Boiler pressure: 140 lbf/in^{2} (0.97 MPa)
- Heating surface: 348.46 sq ft (32.373 m^{2})
- Cylinders: Two, inside
- Cylinder size: 11 in × 15 in (279 mm × 381 mm)
Performance figures
- Tractive effort: 5,837 lbf (25.96 kN)
Career
- Operators: GER » LNER » BR
- Class: GER: G15; LNER: Y6
- Power class: BR: 0F
- Axle load class: LNER/BR: RA 1
- Withdrawn: 1907–1952
- Disposition: Original class scrapped. One replica under construction at Nene Valley Railway

The GER Class G15 was a class of ten 0-4-0T steam tram locomotives designed by Thomas William Worsdell for the British Great Eastern Railway. Six passed to the London and North Eastern Railway (LNER) at the 1923 grouping, and received the LNER classification Y6.

== Overview ==
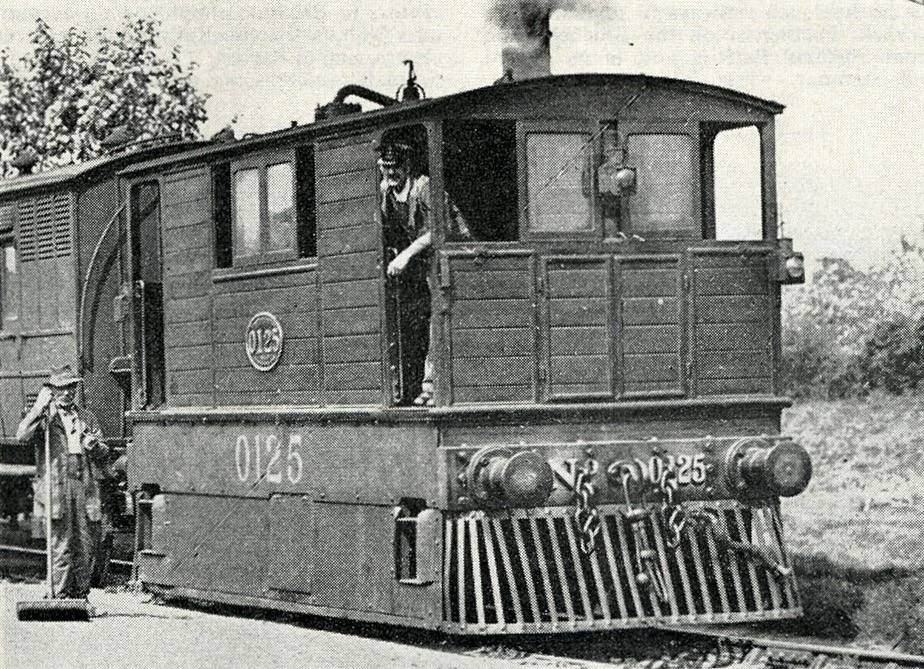
No. 0125 on the tramway at Elm Road crossing.

These locomotives had 11-by-15-inch (279 mm × 381 mm) inside cylinders driving 3-foot-1-inch (0.940 m) wheels. They were used on the Wisbech and Upwell Tramway in East Anglia. They were later used elsewhere after being replaced by the more powerful GER Class C53 (LNER Class J70) 0-6-0Ts.

Table of orders and numbers
Year	Order	Manufacturer	Quantity	GER Nos.	LNER Nos.	Notes
1883–84	G15	Stratford Works	3	130, 131, 132	—, —, 7132	
1885	N17	Stratford Works	2	128, 129	—, 07129	
1891–92	C29	Stratford Works	3	125, 126, 127	07125, 07126, —	
1897	F40	Stratford Works	2	133, 134	7133, 7134	

Four were withdrawn before the grouping – 131 in 1907, 130 in 1909, 127 and 128 in 1913. In January 1921, numbers 125, 126 and 129 were placed on the duplicate list, and had their numbers prefixed with a "0" (The original numbers were reused on the 1921-batch of class C53 locomotives). Four more were withdrawn before the 1946 renumbering — 7132 in 1931, 07129 in 1933, 07125 and 07126 in 1940. The remaining two were numbered 8082 (ex-7133) and 8083 (ex-7134). Both survived into British Railways ownership in 1948 and they were numbered 68082 and 68083. The former was withdrawn in 1951, and the latter in 1952. None has been preserved; although 68083 had been earmarked for preservation, it was scrapped after standing in Stratford paintshop for over a year.

== Replica ==
The Nene Valley Railway were building a replica of the Y6 class to perform as Toby the Tram Engine for their Day Out with Thomas events. However, when the Rev. W. Awdry died in 1997, the project was ceased halfway through. But a new owner has bought the engine, and has revived the project.

=== Individual locomotives ===
List of GER C15 locomotives
GER No.	1921 No.	LNER No.	1946 No.	BR No.	Built	Withdrawn
130	—	—	—	—	1883	1909
131	—	—	—	—	1883	1907
132		7132	—	—	1883	1931
128	—	—	—	—	1885	1913
129	0129	07129	—	—	1885	1933
125	0125	07125	—	—	1891	1940
126	0126	07126	—	—	1892	1940
127	—	—	—	—	1892	1913
133		7133	8082	68082	1897	1951
134		7134	8083	68083	1897	1952
