= Temple Mills =

- Location within Greater London
- London borough: Waltham Forest; Newham; Hackney
- Ceremonial county: Greater London
- Region: London
- Country: England
- Sovereign state: United Kingdom
- Post town: LONDON
- Postcode district: E10 E20
- Dialling code: 020
- Police: Metropolitan
- Fire: London
- Ambulance: London
- London Assembly: North East; City and East; North East

Temple Mills is a district located on the boundary of the London boroughs of Newham and Waltham Forest, with a small part also in Hackney in east London.

Temple Mills is the home of the Eurostar maintenance depot, previously a marshalling yard and wagon works belonging to the Great Eastern Railway. Temple Mills Lane is to the north of the London 2012 Olympic Park.

== History ==
Medieval Hackney was almost entirely rural with much land owned by Sir Thomas Mead. Agriculture and related trades were the main forms of employment. Arable crops were grown, such as beans, wheat, oats and barley. This created a need for milling of the grain, and there were several mills in Hackney. Temple Mills were water mills belonging to the Knights Templar, used mainly for grinding corn from their extensive lands in Homerton and the Marshes. The mills straddled the River Lea and so were partly in Hackney and partly in Leyton.

During the 17th century and 18th century, the former Templar mills were used for a variety of industrial purposes. These included grinding rapeseed for oil, processing leather, making brass kettles, twisting yarn, and manufacturing sheet lead. Gunpowder production at the mills led to a tragedy on the night before Easter 1690, when Peter Pain (a Huguenot refugee from Dieppe) was blown up together with two of the mills, three stone houses, and a vast quantity of gunpowder manufactured by him for the government. His family, and a French minister, also died in the blast.

Temple Mills was also the site of Chobham Farm, a meat cold storage warehouse. A strike and picket of the site in July 1972 led to the arrest and imprisonment of five trade unionists known as the Pentonville Five. The dispute spread nationally becoming a cause célèbre for the trade union movement and created a political crisis.

== Railways ==
=== Wagon works ===
Temple Mills wagon works was opened in 1896 by the Great Eastern Railway on a 23 acres (9.3 hectares) site to the east of the Stratford to Lea Bridge line with an entrance off Temple Mills Lane. Before then, wagons had been constructed and maintained on the original Stratford Works site located between the Great Eastern Main Line and the Stratford to Lea Bridge line. The constrained nature of that site saw the move to Temple Mills (which might have also possibly been influenced by the proximity of the marshalling yards).

In 1921 the works employed 800 men, producing 10 new wagons and repairing 500 wagons every week. The works also produced steel frames for carriages which were sent to Stratford Works for completion. The 1921 guide to the works (which covered Stratford works as well) gave details of the following shops on the site:

- Wagon Erecting Shop
- Smiths shop
- Fitting and Machine shop
- Wheel and Steel Frame shops
- Straightening shop
- Saw Mills
- An Erith Timber Dryer (most wagons were made of wood at this time so this was used to prepare the timber).

In February 1919 the works area flooded.

In 1923 the wagon works was taken over by the London and North Eastern Railway.

In 1948 British Railways took over the operation of the works. Around this time ^{(exact date unknown)} the New Wagon Repair Shop was built on the western edge of the site. This consisted of 8 roads and access was by a wagon traverser (there were two older ones dating from Great Eastern days on the site as well).

In the 1960s the works was responsible for the design of early Freightliner Group and cartic (car carrying) wagons. This was also a time when a lot of older wagons were being scrapped and Temple Mills undertook this work. At this time the works employed around 400 people.

In 1970 the works became part of British Rail Engineering Limited. At this time there was also a workshop known as the New Road Van Shop that dealt with repairs to road vans, containers and barrows etc. This was located just south of the works site. During the 1970s some re-modelling was carried out to enable the works to cope with longer wagons such as Freightliner (container) flats.

The works was closed in 1983. It is reported that some 33,000 wagons were built jointly by Stratford Works and at Temple Mills.

=== Temple Mills TMD ===
51°33′44.1″N 0°1′43.3″W
The residual diesel repair shop closed in 1991. A small traction maintenance depot was opened for EWS after the closure of Stratford TMD for a period, but that was closed in 2007 as changes to the freight market meant this was no longer financially viable. The depot code was TD. The site, now called Orient Way Carriage Sidings, is a stabling location for Electric Multiple Units.

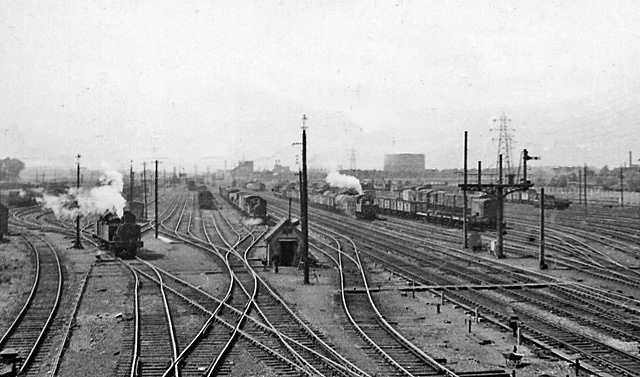
Temple Mills Marshalling Yard in 1956

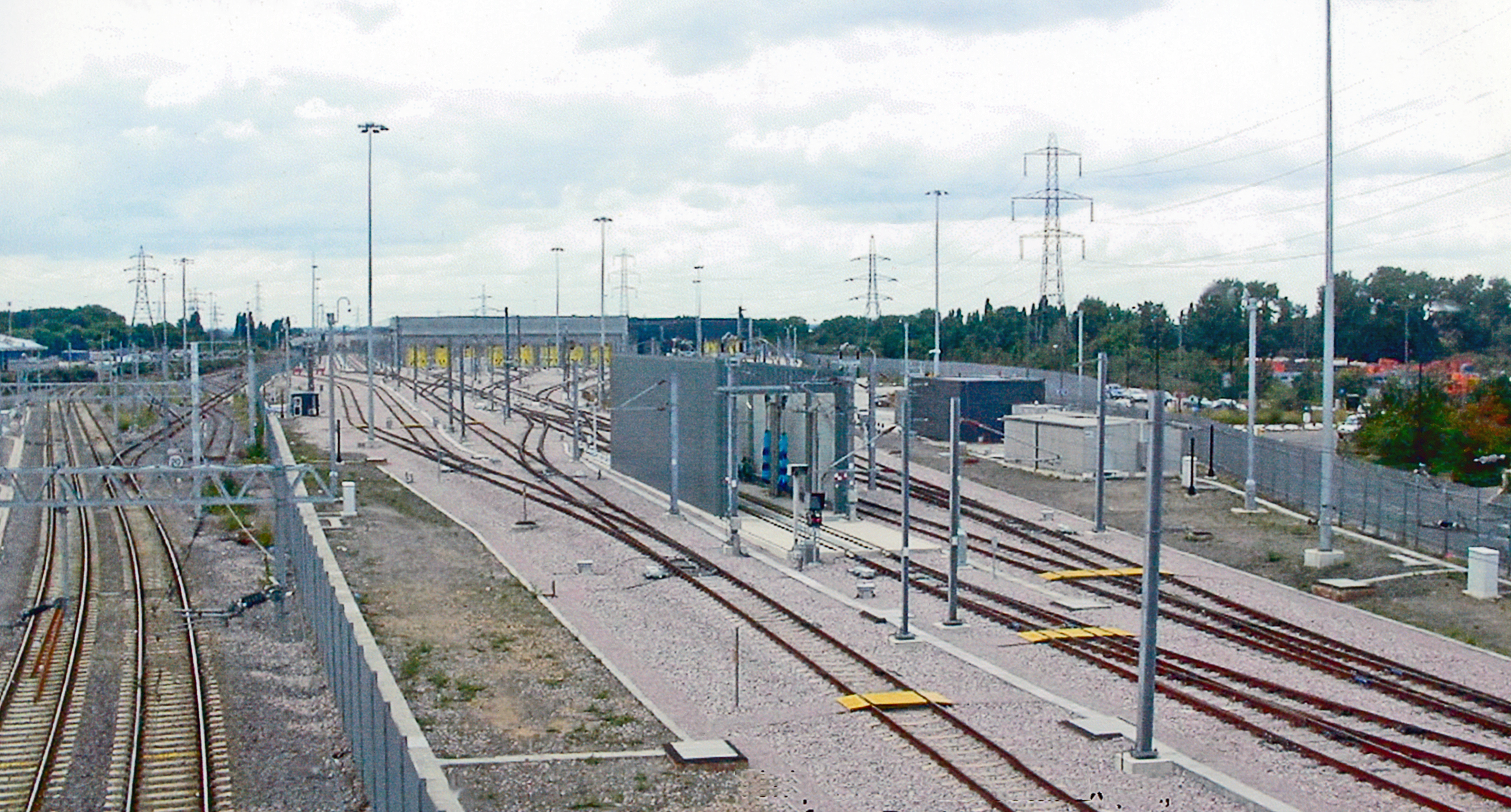
Temple Mills Yard in 2007

=== Eurostar depot ===
51°33′36.4″N 0°1′21.8″W
Temple Mills is the site of the £402 million replacement maintenance depot for all Eurostar sets in the UK. Located near Stratford International and on the edge of the Olympic Park, it replaced the North Pole depot over the course of late 2007, with operations to coincide with the opening of the new international terminal at St Pancras.

Temple Mills depot is designed to house eight train-roads. The overall dimensions of the 8-road shed are just under 450m long by 64m wide, with a floor to ceiling height of approximately 12m. High level walkways in the trusses provide access to the shed services and facilities.

In the 2020s, Eurostar began plans to expand its facilities at Temple Mills. The Office of Rail and Road approved Virgin Rail Group’s application to access maintenance space in Temple Mills Depot by 2030.

== Future ==
2009 saw the opening of Stratford International station on High Speed 1, the Channel Tunnel Rail Link, and in 2012 the location of the main Olympic Park, for the 2012 Summer Olympics, including the Olympic Stadium, Aquatics Centre, and London Velopark.

Stratford has been a focus of regeneration for some years and as of 2006 the 73-hectare brownfield railway lands to the north of the town centre and station were to be redeveloped as Stratford City, centred on Temple Mills. This will form a new purpose-built community of 5,000 homes, offices, retail spaces, schools, public spaces, municipal and other facilities. It is hoped that this will become a major metropolitan centre for East London. Part of Stratford City served as the Olympic Village.
