= Coborn Road railway station =

Former railway station in England

Coborn Road
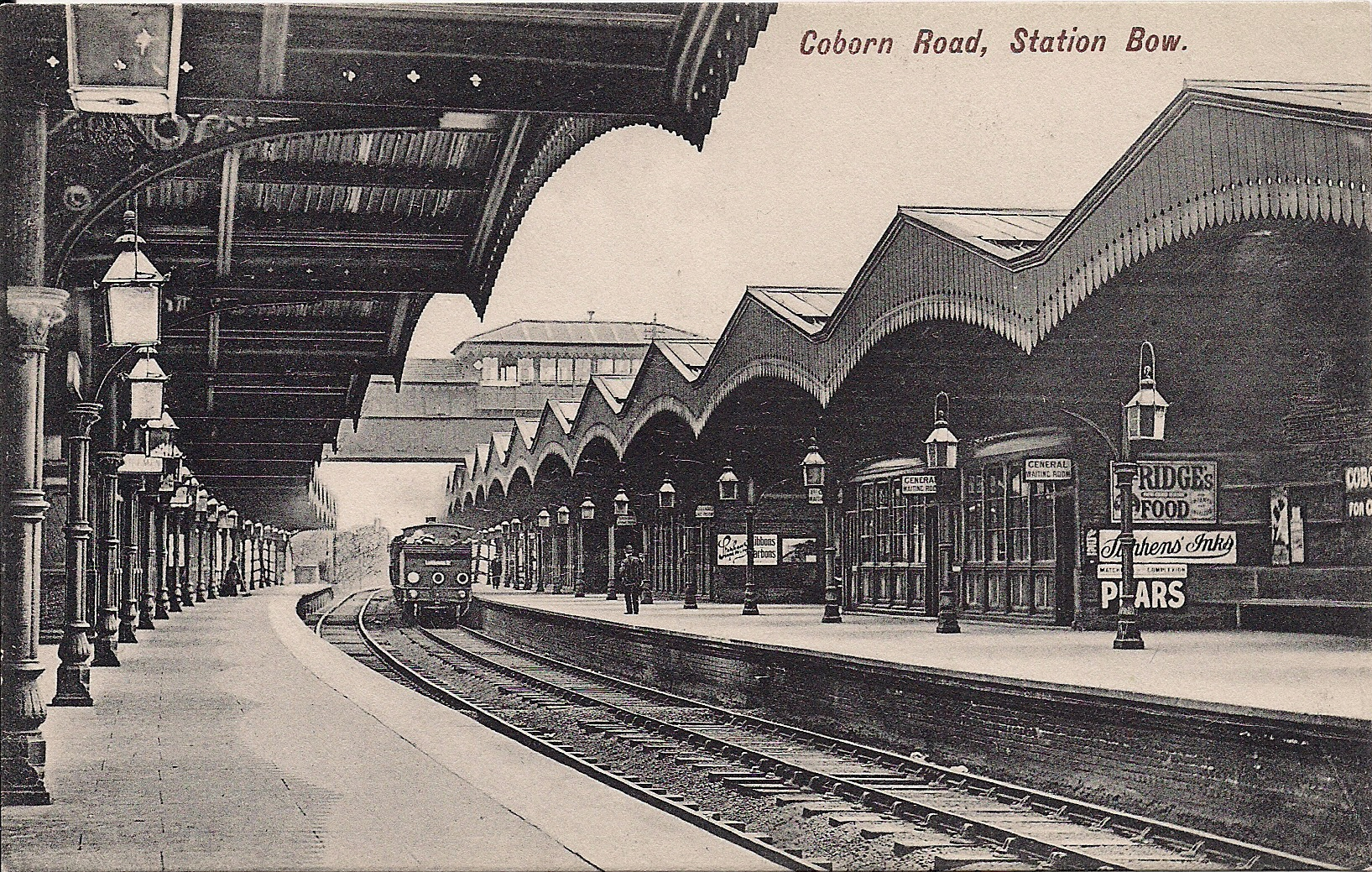
- Coborn Road station, c. 1905
- Interactive map of Coborn Road

General information
- Location: Bow
- Local authority: London Borough of Tower Hamlets
- Number of platforms: 2

Railway companies
- Original company: Great Eastern Railway
- Pre-grouping: Great Eastern Railway
- Post-grouping: London and North Eastern Railway

Key dates
- 1 February 1865: Opened as Old Ford
- 1 March 1879: Renamed Coborn Road
- 2 December 1883: Resited and renamed Coborn Road for Old Ford
- 22 May 1916: Closed
- 5 May 1919: Reopened
- 8 December 1946: Closed

Other information
- Coordinates: 51.5290°N 0.0321°W

Coborn Road was a railway station in Bow, east London, 2 miles 28 chains (3.8 km) down the main line from Liverpool Street. It was opened on 1 February 1865 by the Great Eastern Railway (GER) with the name Old Ford. It had two platforms and the station buildings were located at the London End on Coborn Road itself. (Note: There was another station in the area also named Old Ford, but that was on the North London Railway.)

== History ==
The GER renamed the station as Coborn Road on 1 March 1879. When the line was quadrupled between James Street (near Globe Road & Devonshire Street railway station), two new platforms were built on the north side of the existing line and slightly to the west replacing a couple of sidings. The second station was opened on 2 December 1883 at which time its name was changed again, to Coborn Road for Old Ford; it kept this name for the remainder of its life. It had two passenger entrances in Coborn Road and Grove Road.

As part of a widespread policy during the First World War of closing inner-city stops on the London main lines, the station closure was announced for 22 May 1916. The closure was not popular and on 17 May 1916 a protest meeting chaired by the then Mayor of the Metropolitan Borough of Poplar took place at Bow Baths Hall. This made little difference and the station duly closed on 22 May and reopened on 5 May 1919.

After the grouping of 1923 operation of the station passed to the London and North Eastern Railway (LNER).

During World War 2 on 13 June 1944, the bridge across Grove Road (immediately south of the station) was hit by one of the first V-1 flying bomb attacks. All lines were closed but within 36 hours, engineers had installed a temporary bridge and the line re-opened for traffic.

It was permanently closed on 8 December 1946 following the opening of the Central Line through to Stratford four days earlier which created a duplicate route. The station was demolished after closure and the signal box closed on 6 February 1949. By 2016 there were outline traces of the down platform and staircase. Much of its former catchment area has been taken over by the expanded Mile End Underground station and Bow Church DLR station.

== See also ==
- List of closed railway stations in London
- Great Eastern Railway

== Notes ==
Preceding station	Disused railways	Following station
Globe Road	Great Eastern; Railway; Great Eastern Main Line	Stratford
