= GER Class B74 =

British class of steam locomotives

GER Class B74 LNER Class Y4
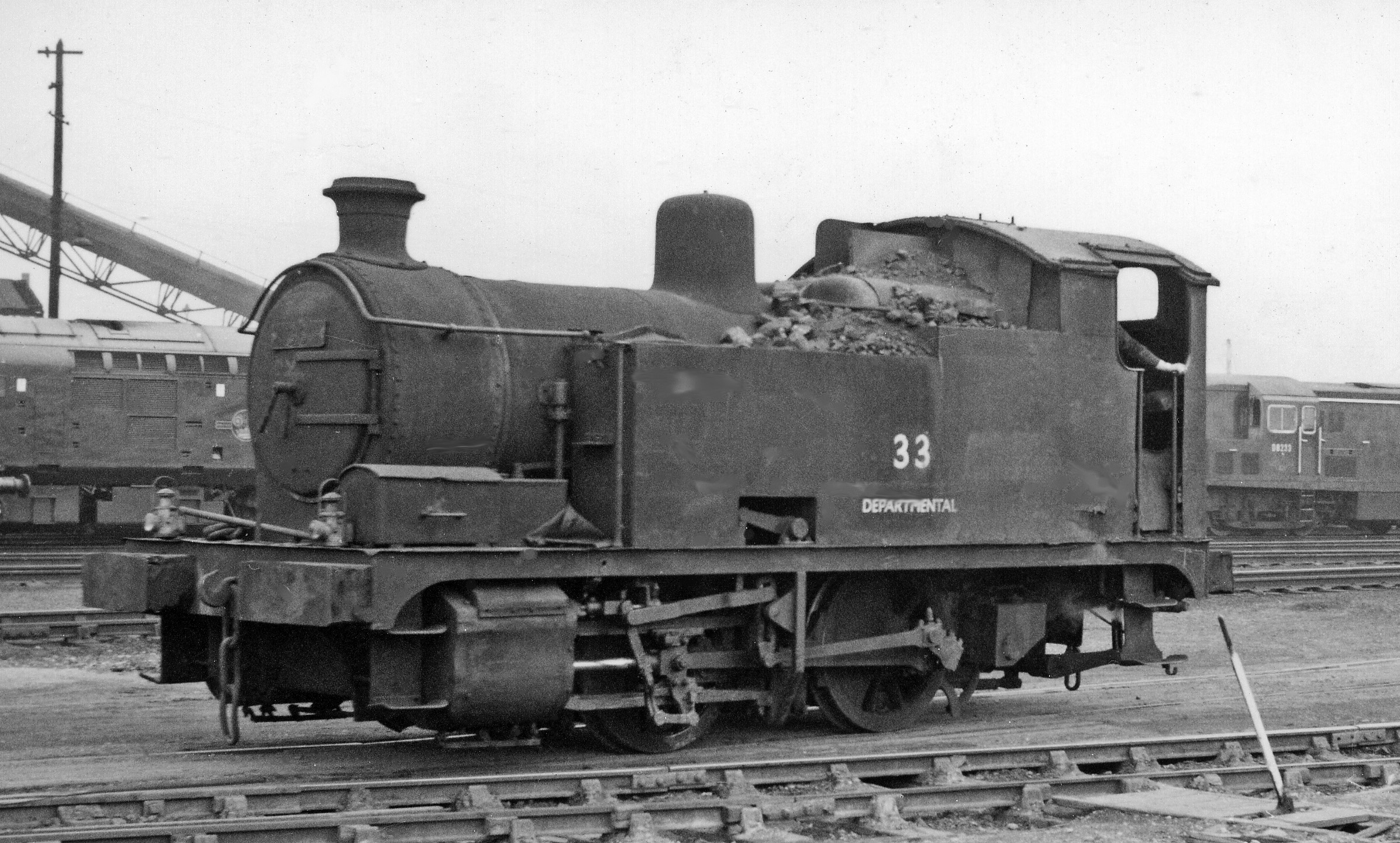
- Departmental (Service) locomotive No. 33 at Stratford Locomotive Depot, 18 February 1961
Type and origin
- Power type: Steam
- Designer: A. J. Hill
- Builder: Stratford Works
- Build date: 1913–1921
- Total produced: 5
Specifications
- Configuration
  - Whyte: 0-4-0T
  - UIC: B n2t
- Gauge: 4 ft 8 1/2 in (1,435 mm)
- Driver dia.: 3 ft 10 in (1.168 m)
- Wheelbase: 6 ft 0 in (1.829 m)
- Length: 24 ft 1 1/2 in (7.35 m) over buffers
- Axle load: 19 long tons 1 cwt (42,700 lb or 19.4 t)
- Loco weight: 38 long tons 1 cwt (85,200 lb or 38.7 t) full
- Fuel type: Coal
- Fuel capacity: 0 long tons 15 cwt (1,700 lb or 0.8 t)
- Water cap.: 750 imp gal (3,410 L; 901 US gal)
- Firebox
  - Grate area: 13.9 sq ft (1.29 m^{2})
- Boiler: LNER Diagram 40
- Boiler pressure: 180 lbf/in^{2} (1.24 MPa)
- Heating surface
  - Firebox: 75.1 sq ft (6.98 m^{2})
  - Tubes: 905.4 sq ft (84.11 m^{2})
  - Total surface: 980.5 sq ft (91.09 m^{2})
- Superheater: None
- Cylinders: Two, outside
- Cylinder size: 17 in × 20 in (432 mm × 508 mm)
- Valve gear: Walschaerts
- Valve type: Slide valves
Performance figures
- Tractive effort: 19,224 lbf (85.51 kN)
Career
- Operators: Great Eastern Railway; → London and North Eastern Railway; → British Railways
- Class: GER: B74; LNER: Y4
- Power class: BR: 0F
- Nicknames: Pots
- Axle load class: LNER/BR: RA 6
- Withdrawn: 1955-1957 (4), 1963 (1)
- Disposition: All scrapped

The GER Class B74 was a class of five 0-4-0T steam locomotives designed by Alfred John Hill for the Great Eastern Railway. They all passed to the London and North Eastern Railway at the 1923 grouping and received the LNER classification Y4.

== History ==
These locomotives had 17-by-20-inch (432 by 508 mm) outside cylinders driving 3-foot-10-inch (1.168 m) wheels. They were built to replace the older, less powerful Class 209 (LNER Class Y5). From 1914 two of the class worked the Globe Road & Devonshire Street goods yards. No. 227 was built for use on the branch to the Blackwall pepper warehouse on the western side of Bow Creek; it had a height of 12 feet 7 inches (3.84 m) measured to the top of the chimney. The next two were needed to serve a goods yard that was only accessible by passing under a low bridge, and these had their chimney, dome and cab reduced in height to suit the bridge – the maximum height of these was 11 feet 4 3/4 inches (3.473 m). The final two were also built to the reduced height, even though no. 210 was intended purely for use within Stratford Works, where no height restrictions existed. To ensure maximum interchangeability, no. 7227 (as it had by then become) was altered to conform during July 1931.

Table of orders and numbers
Year	Order	Manufacturer	Quantity	GER Nos.	LNER Nos.	LNER 1944 Nos.	Notes
1913	B74	Stratford Works	1	227	7227	8125	
1914	B77	Stratford Works	2	228, 226	7228, 7226,	8126, 8127	
1921	A82	Stratford Works	2	229, 210	7229, 7210	8128, 8129	

All were still in service at the 1923 grouping; the LNER adding 7000 to the numbers of nearly all the ex-Great Eastern locomotives, including the Class B74 locomotives. There were renumbered 8125–8129 in the 1944 renumbering scheme. At nationalisation in 1948, British Railways added 60000 to their numbers.

In 1952, number 68129 was transferred to the Service (departmental) list and renumbered 33. Withdrawals started in 1955 with 68125, with 68127 and 68128 going in 1956 and 68126 in 1957. The last to be withdrawn was 33, in 1963.
