= Devonshire Street railway station =

Former railway station in England

Devonshire Street
- Interactive map of Devonshire Street

General information
- Location: Mile End Old Town
- Grid reference: TQ356826
- Owner: Eastern Counties Railway
- Number of platforms: 2

Key dates
- 1839: Opened
- 1840: Closed
- Replaced by: Shoreditch

Other information
- Coordinates: 51.526°N 0.047°W

Devonshire Street was a short-lived railway station in the parish of Mile End Old Town, in the East End of London. It was opened on 20 June 1839 as a temporary London terminus of the Eastern Counties Railway (ECR) from Romford prior to the construction of Shoreditch station which became the permanent terminus.

On opening the weekday service consisted of seven weekday and six Sunday trains. An additional train for Romford Market ran on Wednesdays.

After Shoreditch opened, Devonshire Street continued in use as a through passenger station for a year before it was closed in 1840.

In 1884 a new station called Globe Road & Devonshire Street opened close to the site of the closed Devonshire Street station.

The street after which the station was named was later incorporated into the northern part of Bancroft Road, running east–west next to the tracks. The station was situated on an embankment adjacent to the Devonshire Street skew bridge.

== See also ==
- List of closed railway stations in London
- Great Eastern Railway

| Preceding station | Disused railways | Following station |
|---|---|---|
| Terminus | Eastern Counties Railway; Great Eastern Main Line | Stratford |
