= GER Class Y14 =

Class of 0-6-0 mixed traffic locomotives built by the Great Eastern Railway

GER Class Y14 LNER Class J15
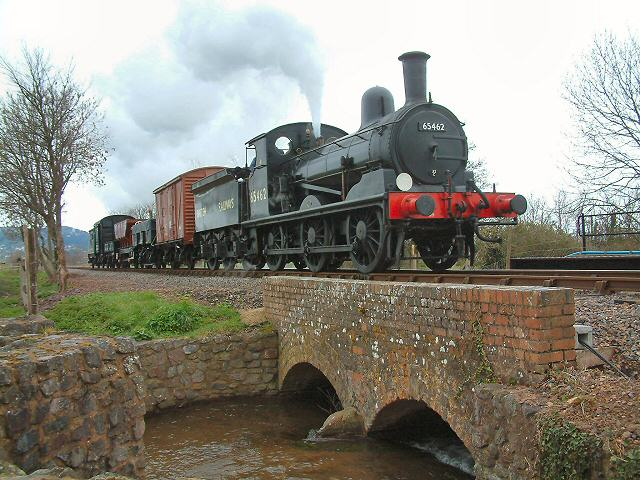
Type and origin
- Power type: Steam
- Designer: T. W. Worsdell
- Builder: Stratford Works (270); Sharp, Stewart & Co. (19)
- Build date: 1883-1913
- Total produced: 289
Specifications
- Configuration
  - Whyte: 0-6-0
  - UIC: C n2
- Gauge: 4 ft 8 1/2 in (1,435 mm) standard gauge
- Driver dia.: 4 ft 11 in (1.499 m)
- Length: 47 ft 3 in (14.40 m)
- Loco weight: 37.1 long tons (37.7 t; 41.6 short tons)
- Tender weight: 30.65 long tons (31.14 t; 34.33 short tons)
- Fuel type: Coal
- Fuel capacity: 5 long tons (5.1 t; 5.6 short tons)
- Water cap.: 2,640 imp gal (12,000 L; 3,170 US gal)
- Boiler pressure: 160 psi (1,100 kPa)
- Cylinders: Two, inside
- Cylinder size: 17 1/2 in × 24 in (444 mm × 610 mm)
Performance figures
- Tractive effort: 16,940 lbf (75,400 N)
Career
- Operators: Great Eastern Railway; → London and North Eastern Railway; → British Railways
- Class: GER: Y14; LNER: J15
- Power class: BR: 1P2F
- Axle load class: LNER/BR: Route availability 1
- Withdrawn: 1922 - 1962
- Disposition: One preserved, remainder scrapped

The Great Eastern Railway (GER) Class Y14 is a class of 0-6-0 steam locomotive. The LNER classified them J15.

The Class Y14 was designed by T.W. Worsdell for both freight and passenger duties - a veritable 'maid of all work'. Introduced in July 1883, they were so successful that all the succeeding Locomotive Superintendents continued to build new batches up until 1913 with little design change, the final total being 289. During World War I, 43 of the engines served in France and Belgium.

== Background ==
On 10–11 December 1891, the Great Eastern Railway's Stratford Works built one of these locomotives and had it in steam with a coat of grey primer in 9 hours 47 minutes; this remains a world record. The locomotive then went off to run 36,000 miles (58,000 km) on Peterborough to London coal trains before coming back to the works for the final coat of paint. It lasted 40 years and ran a total of 1,127,750 miles (1,814,940 km).

Because of their light weight the locomotives were given the Route Availability (RA) number 1, indicating that they could work over nearly all routes.

Table of orders and numbers
Year	Order	Manufacturer	Quantity	GER Nos.	LNER Nos.	1946 Nos.	Notes
1883	Y14	Stratford Works	10	610–619	7610–7618, —	—	
1884	K15	Stratford Works	20	620–639	7620–7639	—	
1884	—	Sharp, Stewart & Co. 3146–3164	19	37–41, 119–124, 592–599	7037, 07038–07039, —, 7600, 7119–7124, 7592–7599	—	41 renumbered 600 in 1912
1885	N16	Stratford Works	10	680–689	7680–7689	—	
1885–86	P17	Stratford Works	10	690–699	7690–7699	—	
1886	M18	Stratford Works	10	800–809	7609, 7801–7809	—	800 renumbered 609 in 1892
1886–87	X18	Stratford Works	10	810–819	7810–7819	5350	
1887	D20	Stratford Works	10	820–829	7820–7829	5351–5353	
1887–88	U20	Stratford Works	10	527–536	7527–7536	5354–5356	
1888	R21	Stratford Works	10	537–541, 830–834	7537–7541, 7830–7834	5357–5360	
1889	T22	Stratford Works	10	835–844	7835–7844	5361–5364	
1889	P23	Stratford Works	10	845–854	7845–7854	5365–5372	
1889	T23	Stratford Works	10	855–864	7855–7864	5373–5375	
1889	Y23	Stratford Works	10	865–874	7865–7874	5376–5381	
1890	U25	Stratford Works	10	875–884	7875–7884	5382–5388	
1890	Y25	Stratford Works	10	885–894	7885–7894	5389–5394	
1891	L28	Stratford Works	10	895–904	7895–7904	5395–5400	
1891	N28	Stratford Works	10	905–914	7905–7914	5401–5407	
1891	P28	Stratford Works	10	915–924	7915–7924	5408–5414	
1891–92	S28	Stratford Works	10	925–934	7925–7934	5414–5421	
1892	X28	Stratford Works	10	936–945	7936–7945	5422–5427	
1899	I45	Stratford Works	10	507–516	7507–7516	5428–5435	
1899	S45	Stratford Works	10	517–526	7517–7526	5436–5439	
1899	X45	Stratford Works	10	640–649	7640–7649	5440–5449	
1906	A60	Stratford Works	10	552–561	7552–7561	5450–5459	
1912	B70	Stratford Works	10	562–571	7562–7571	5460–5469	
1913	G73	Stratford Works	10	542–551	7542–7551	5470–5479	

== Accidents and incidents ==
- On 25 September 1900, locomotive No. 522 suffered a boiler explosion at Westerfield, Suffolk. Both crew members of the locomotive, driver John Barnard and fireman William MacDonald, were killed.
- On 20 January 1915, locomotive No. 629 was hauling a freight train that collided with the rear of a passenger train, hauled by GER Class T26 2-4-0 No. 446, at County School railway station, Norfolk.
- On 7 January 1927, locomotive No. 7613 was hauling a freight train that was in collision with a lorry at Roudham Heath, Norfolk, on the Breckland Line due to errors by the crossing keeper. The lorry driver was killed.
- On 4 October 1929, locomotive No. 7938 was hauling a freight train that departed against a danger signal at Tottenham, London and was subsequently stopped foul of a junction. Both crew abandoned the locomotive before a northbound mail train, hauled by LNER Class B17 4-6-0 No. 2808 Gunton, collided with the rear of the freight. 18 people were injured.
- In 1934, LNER No.7902 crashed into the buffer stops at Ongar Station and climbed the wall. No one was killed though the crew received a few minor injuries.
- In the late 1950s, No. 65475 had to be rerailed by crane due to an unknown cause and location.
- On 17 November 2018, locomotive No. 564 struck a vehicle on a level crossing near Sheringham in Norfolk. The driver of the Mercedes involved in the collision ignored the warning lights at the crossing and proceeded through into the path of the oncoming locomotive, which was travelling at around 10 mph at the time. The collision reportedly occurred at around 11:30 AM.

== Notable features ==
As built all the locomotives had a stovepipe chimney; this was replaced in LNER days by a cast chimney with a small lip. The original Worsdell and early Holden series had three-ring boilers with the steam dome placed in the middle. Also the Worsdell boilers had a flat grate, however from 1890 Holden developed a boiler with a sloping grate and a two-ring telescopic barrel with the dome located well forward. The advantage of the dome position was a short 5½ inch steam pipe which limited pressure drop between the boiler and the cylinders. This boiler was adopted as standard and persisted on all Great Eastern Locomotives down to 1898; from then on it was perpetuated on the smaller locomotives as long as these remained essentially in their original configuration - which could be down to the 1960s.

As with all Great Eastern classes, the Y14 had a cab with a low wooden roof covered with canvas sealed by a coat of lead paint. This was replaced in LNER days by a higher arched sheet metal roof. Some engines had special side window cabs for service on the exposed Brightlingsea and Colne Valley branches.

== Allocations ==
On 1 January 1923 there were 272 J15 locomotives in existence. They were allocated as follows:

- Cambridge: 48
- Colchester: 14
- Ipswich: 32
- King's Lynn: 5
- Lincoln: 3
- Lowestoft: 7
- March: 17
- Norwich: 36
- Parkeston: 2
- Peterborough East: 19
- Stratford: 91
- Yarmouth: 4

In 1942 during World War II, six locomotives were drafted in to assist with coal traffic in South Yorkshire with three allocated to Mexborough engine shed and three to Barnsley engine shed.

On 1 January 1948 when British Railways was formed, there were 127 J15 locomotives in existence.

Unusually, in 1957 a couple of the class were allocated to Aylesbury and worked freight trains on the former Great Western Railway branch from Princes Risborough to Watlington before being withdrawn in 1958.

== In film ==
In September 1936 locomotives 7541 and 7835 were withdrawn by the LNER and sold to London Film Productions for their film Knight Without Armour. The two locomotives were moved to Denham film studios and underwent cosmetic modification to look more Russian as that was where the film was set. The locomotives were then sold to the War Department and worked on the Shropshire and Montgomeryshire Railway as WD221 and WD212. During their war service both were involved in incidents and returned to Stratford in 1944 and subsequently scrapped.

Another member of the class appeared in the 1954 film Happy Ever After disguised as an Irish locomotive.

== Preservation ==
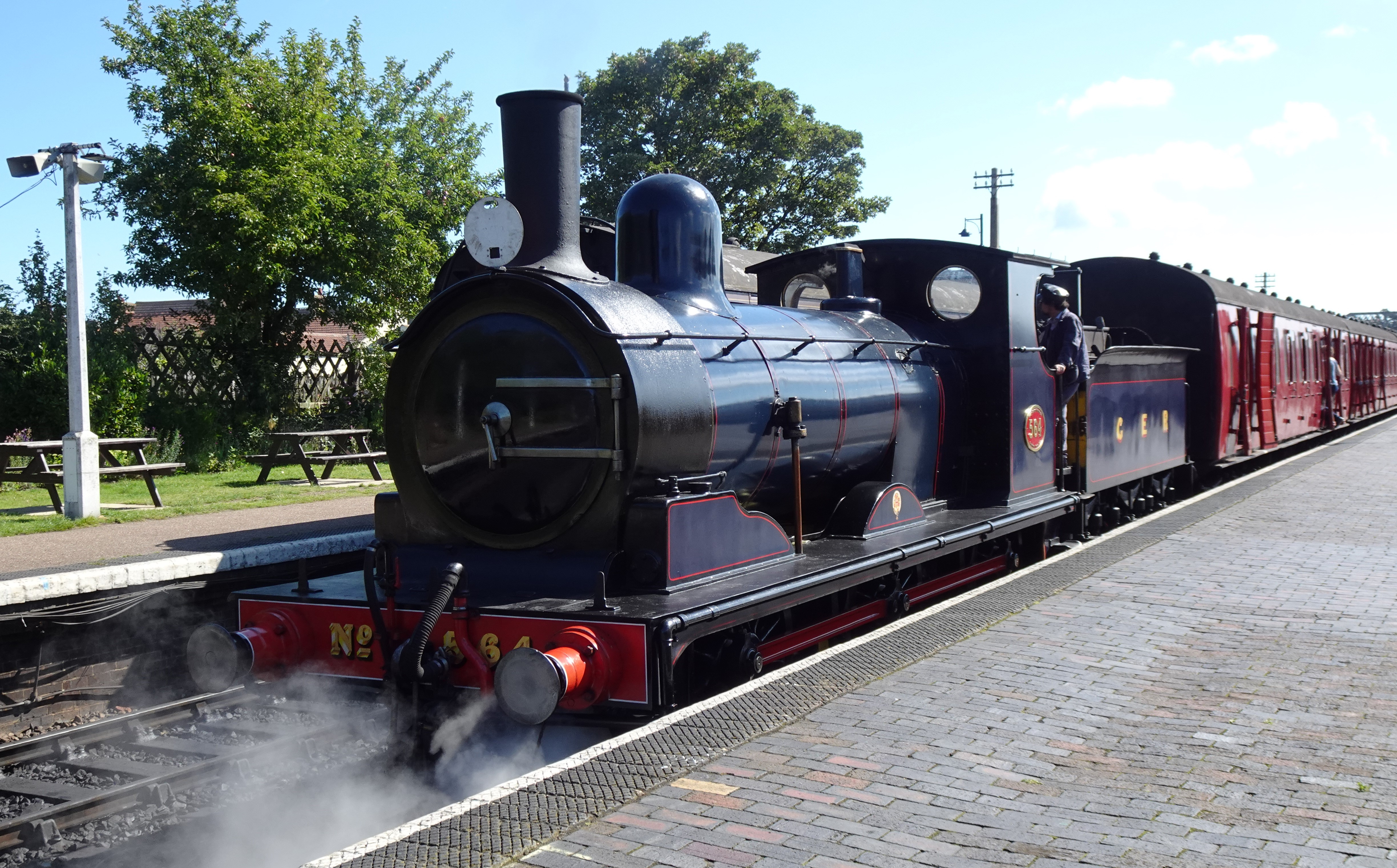
564 at Sheringham

Number 564/7564/65462 is preserved on the North Norfolk Railway and owned by the Midland and Great Northern Joint Railway Society. In 2002 the locomotive reached the end of a major overhaul and was painted in LNER (numbered 7564) and BR black numbered 65462) liveries for the duration of its boiler ticket. It originally operated in these liveries when classified as a J15 in LNER and BR days. Following withdrawal from service in 2013, the locomotive received another overhaul (completed 2015) where it was outshopped in GER lined blue and sporting its original number of 564 and representing its days when classified as a Y14.

65469 was originally a candidate for preservation, but it was scrapped.

== Models ==
Hornby produces a ready-to-run model of the J15 in 00 gauge (4 mm) in BR (with the rebuilt high-arched cab roof), LNER liveries (both as-built and high-arch cab roofs) and more recently as a Y14 in GER blue. Also in 00 gauge, there are kits from Alan Gibson and Nu-Cast. Finley and Smith produce a 3 mm kit. A 7mm (O gauge) kit is made by Connoisseur Models.
