= GER Class 209 =

0-4-0 saddle tank locomotive

GER Class 209 (LNER Class Y5)
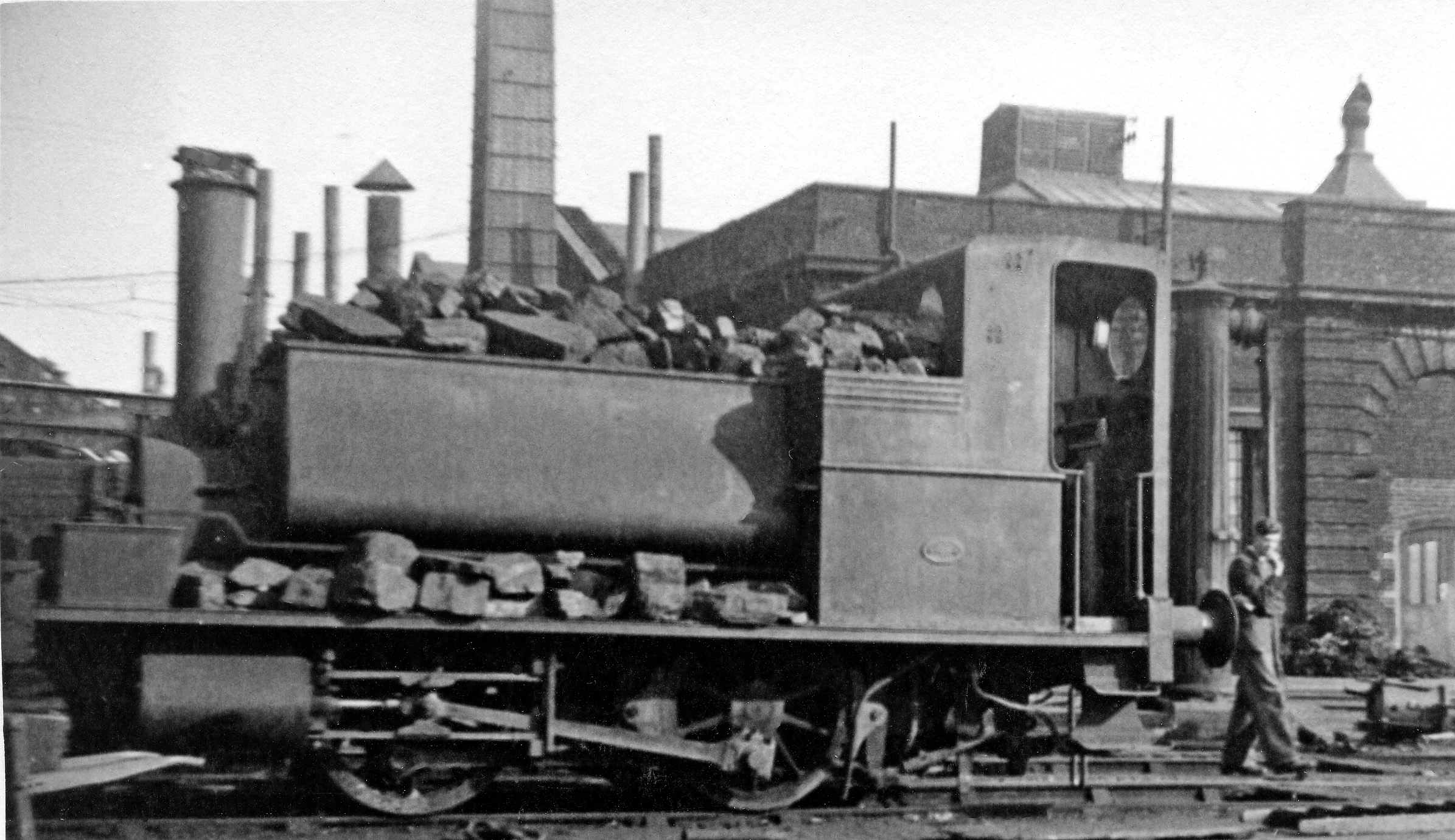
- GER Class 209 (LNER Class Y5) 0-4-0ST Service locomotive. Built at Stratford Works in 1903 as No. 230 (LNER 7230, then 8081 and BR 68081), it became the shunter for the Carriage Works at Stratford and is seen here outside Stratford Old (Locomotive) Works, 28 September 1946.
Type and origin
- Power type: Steam
- Designer: Neilson and Company
- Builder: Neilson and Company (4); GER Stratford Works (4)
- Model: Neilson 12-inch Mineral Engine
- Build date: 1874–1903
- Total produced: 8
Specifications
- Configuration
  - Whyte: 0-4-0ST
  - UIC: B n2t
- Gauge: 4 ft 8 1/2 in (1,435 mm) standard gauge
- Driver dia.: 3 ft 7 in (1.09 m)
- Wheelbase: 5 ft 9 in (1.753 m)
- Length: 21 ft 4 1/2 in (6.515 m) over buffers
- Loco weight: 21 long tons 4 cwt (47,500 lb or 21.5 t)
- Fuel type: Coal
- Fuel capacity: 0 long tons 10 cwt (1,100 lb or 0.5 t)
- Water cap.: 470 imp gal (2,100 L; 560 US gal)
- Firebox
  - Grate area: 7.01 sq ft (0.651 m^{2})
- Boiler pressure: 140 psi (0.97 MPa)
- Heating surface: 514.55 sq ft (47.803 m^{2})
- Cylinders: Two, outside
- Cylinder size: 12 in × 20 in (305 mm × 508 mm)
Performance figures
- Tractive effort: 7,970 lbf (35.45 kN)
Career
- Operators: GER » LNER » BR
- Class: GER: 209; LNER: Y5
- Nicknames: Coffee Pot
- Withdrawn: 1911–1948
- Disposition: One preserved, remainder scrapped

The GER Class 209 (LNER Class Y5) is a class of 0-4-0 saddle tank steam locomotives of the Great Eastern Railway. These locomotives were similar to the NBR G Class but had flat-topped, instead of round-topped, tanks. A total of eight were built – four by Neilson and Company in 1874 and four more by the GER's Stratford Works between 1897 and 1903.

== Overview ==
=== Neilson locomotives ===
In order to shunt locations with tight curves and weight restrictions, two 0-4-0T locomotives were purchased from Neilson and Company to one of that company's standard designs by the GER, and this was followed by an order for a further two locomotives in 1876. In 1894–1895 these four locos were rebuilt under James Holden, the work including new boilers, steam brakes, and covered cabs. Two of these locomotives worked at Globe Road & Devonshire Street goods yards between 1874 and 1914.

=== Stratford locomotives ===
In 1897 two new locomotives were built at Stratford Works, identical to the rebuilt 209 Class, but with slightly higher bunkers, and a further two locomotives to this new design were built, also at Stratford, in 1903.

== LNER ownership ==
Four locomotives had been withdrawn or sold before 1923. The remaining four passed into London and North Eastern Railway ownership at the grouping in 1923. Their LNER class was Y5.

== Withdrawal ==
Two locomotives, 226 and 227 were scrapped in 1911. By 1914, number 228 was placed on the duplicate list, becoming 0228; its old number being re-used by a new Class B74 (LNER Class Y4) locomotive. Number 210 was also scrapped in 1914, and 229 was sold in 1918. Number 7209 was withdrawn in 1926. Numbers 07228 and 7230 became departmental locomotives at Stratford, with the former being withdrawn in 1927, after having been used as a stationary boiler. Number 7231 had been adapted as a tram locomotive and used at Colchester, before being withdrawn in 1931.

== BR ownership ==
The last member of the class left in service, 7230, was renumbered 8081 in 1944; and just survived into British Railways ownership in 1948 but was scrapped early that year before it could receive its BR number.

== Table of orders and numbers ==
Table of orders and numbers
Year	Order	Manufacturer	Quantity	GER Nos.	LNER Nos	Notes
1874	E429	Neilson & Co. 1940	1	209	7209	wdn. 1926
1875	E431	Neilson & Co. 1942	1	210	—	scr. 1914
1876	E451	Neilson & Co. 2118, 2119	2	228, 229	07228, —	228 wdn. 1927; 229 sold 1918
1897	G40	Stratford Works	2	226, 227	—, —	both scr. 1911
1903	R55	Stratford Works	2	230, 231	7230, 7231	230 scr. 1948; 231 wdn. 1931

Key

- wdn. = withdrawal date, scrapping date unknown
- scr. = scrapping date

== Preservation ==
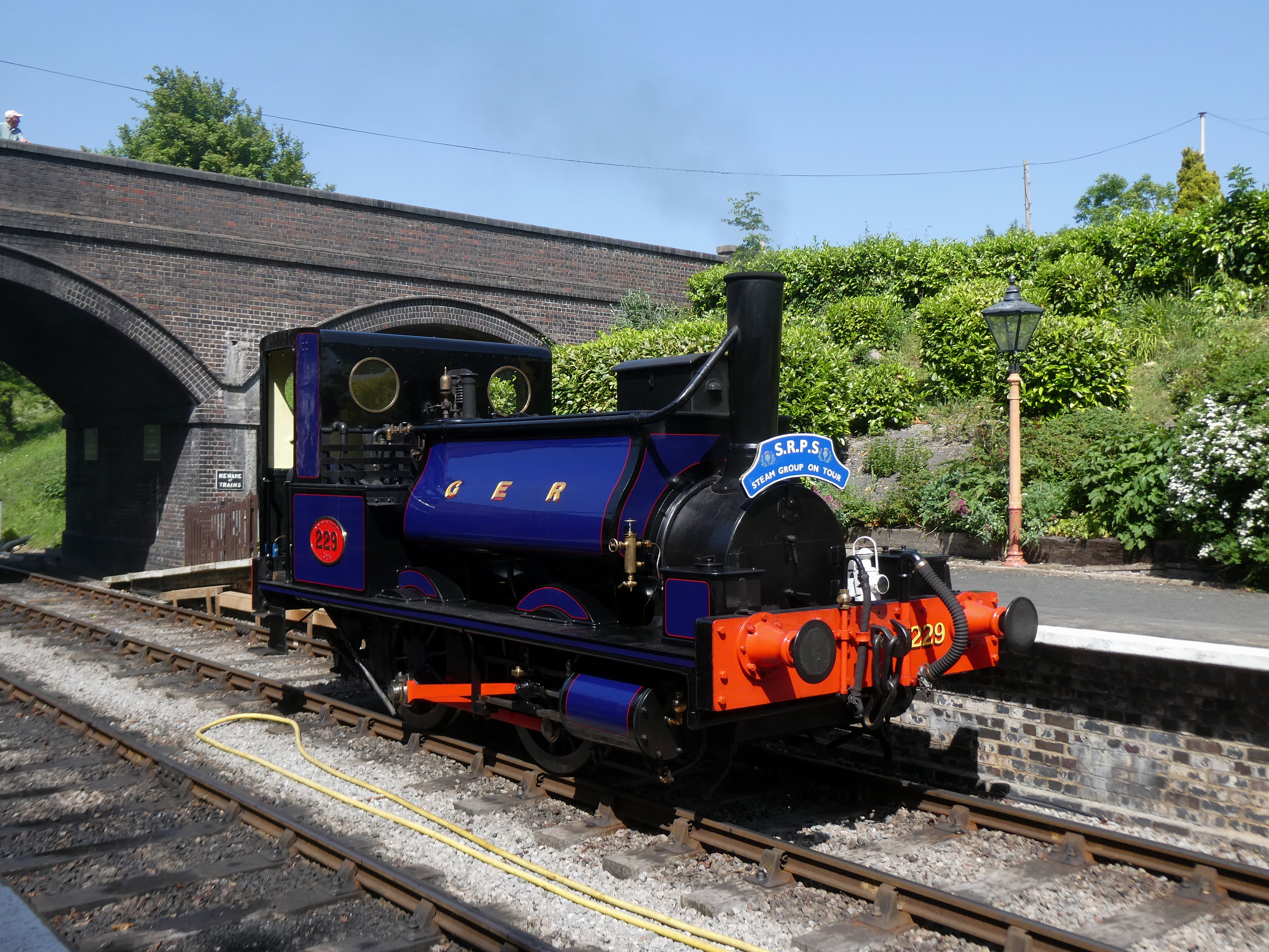
Preserved number 229, running on the Gloucestershire-Warwickshire Railway in 2026

One locomotive, GER no. 229, was exhibited at the former North Woolwich Old Station Museum, which closed in 2008. This is the one which was sold in 1918. It was moved to a site near Lydney, Gloucestershire, as a static display awaiting restoration to working order in 2012. Restored at the Flour Mill, it returned to working order in 2025.

== Modelling ==
A 4 mm scale kit was formerly available from High Level Kits. A 4 mm scale 3d Print-able body is available on Thingiverse.

== See also ==
- Minimum railway curve radius
