= Stratford Works =

Railway workshops in East London, England

Coordinates: 51.5442°N 0.0096°W

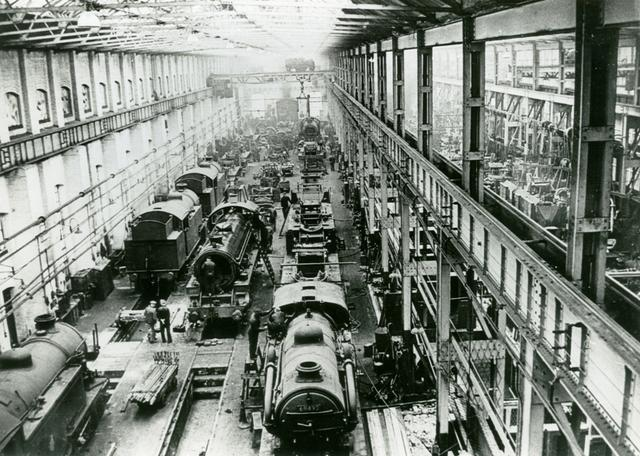
Engine repair shop in the 1950s

Stratford Works was the locomotive-building works of the Great Eastern Railway situated at Stratford, London, England. The original site of the works was located in the 'V' between the Great Eastern Main Line and the Stratford to Lea Bridge route and in the early years was also the home of Stratford Locomotive Depot. The final part of the works closed in 1991.

Overall Stratford works built 1,702 locomotives; 5,500 passenger vehicles and 33,000 goods wagons (although a significant number of these were built at the nearby Temple Mills wagon works when wagon building moved from the Stratford site in 1896).

== History ==
=== Early history (1840-1862) ===
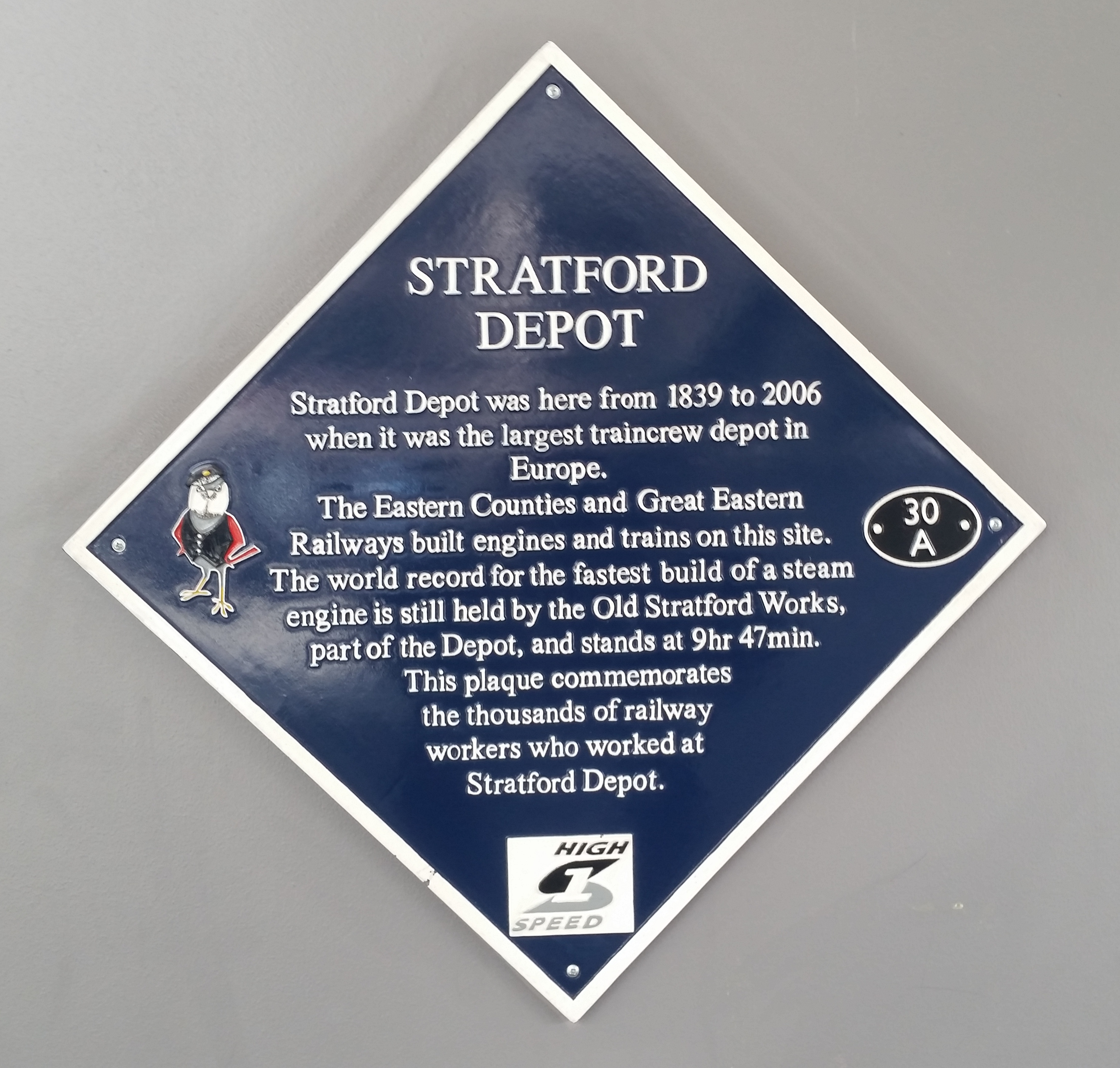
Plaque commemorating Stratford Works, in place at Stratford International station

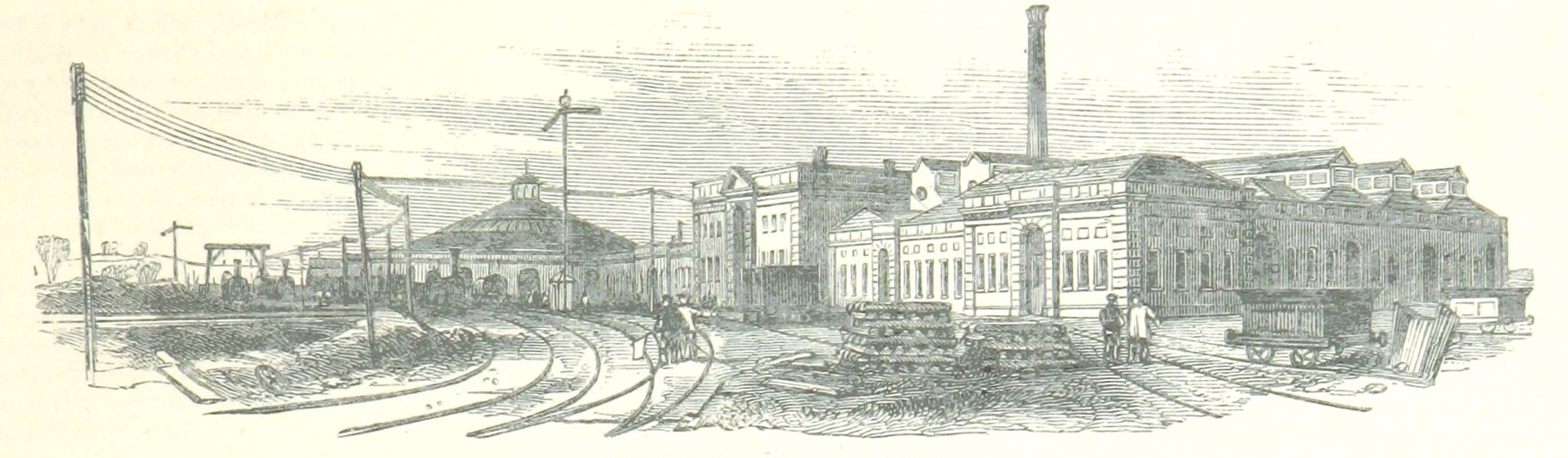
Stratford Works pictured in 1851

Activity on the site was started in 1840 by the Northern and Eastern Railway who had opened a new line that joined the Eastern Counties Railway at Stratford. The locomotives were maintained at a roundhouse called the Polygon which was built between July and September 1840 to a design by Robert Stephenson (a surviving example of which can be seen at Derby).

In 1847–1848 by the GER's predecessor, the Eastern Counties Railway moved onto the site as its own works at Romford had outgrown that site. Railway King George Hudson was behind this move and many of the original buildings were replaced at this time by new buildings. The area was known as Hudson Town for a number of years as the company built a number of houses in the area as well.

In 1850 1,000 men were employed at the works.

It was not until 1850 that the Eastern Counties Railway under Gooch built a locomotive at the then newly opened Stratford Works. Number 20 was the first of a class of six 2-2-2T locomotives (although three more were also built by R. B. Longridge and Company of Bedlington, Northumberland). Slightly bigger improved versions of the class followed in 1853 and 1854.

Fog signals which contained gunpowder were manufactured at the works with a special reinforced building being provided c. 1855. On 26 February 1857 this building exploded with three casualties. The subsequent inquiry was unable to uncover why the explosion had happened.

==== Locomotive superintendents ====
From 1834 until his resignation in February 1843 resident engineer John Braithwaite responsibilities included locomotive matters, thereafter incumbents of Locomotive Superintendent of the Eastern Counties Railway were:

- 1843–1845 William Fernihough
- 1845–1846 Thomas Scott
- 1846–1850 John Hunter
- 1850–1856 John Viret Gooch
- 1858–1862 Robert Sinclair

=== Great Eastern Railway era (1862-1922) ===
In 1862 the Great Eastern Railway took over the running of the works.

In the 1870s land was acquired to the north and west of Stratford station and new locomotive sheds were built. This site was sometimes referred to as High Meads. However locomotives were still serviced on the original site until the 1880s. The carriage and wagon works expanded into new buildings alongside Angel Road and Leyton Road.

In 1875 a six-month period saw 66 engines repaired.

Between 1870 and 1900, some 960 locomotives were made at Stratford.

In 1891 the works set a new time record for building locomotives – a Class Y14 tender engine was built in 9 hours 47 minutes from the time the frames were stamped out to the completed and fully functional locomotive leaving the works. This record still stands.

However a need to find extra capacity for carriage painting led to some 200 carriages per year being repainted at a depot at Felixstowe Beach railway station.

Wagon building and maintenance moved to Temple Mills Wagon Works in 1896.

An order for two steam breakdown cranes was placed in 1902 and completed in 1908. It was unusual for a main line railway company to build its own cranes and most British companies bought their cranes from either Cowans (Carlisle), Ransome & Rapier (Ipswich) or Craven Brothers (Manchester). The latter of these lasted into British Rail days being allocated to Ipswich and after withdrawal was cut up at Saxmundham in 1967.

By 1912 some 6,500 people were employed at the works. During 1912 39 new locomotives were built with 10 others being converted (upgraded?). The new builds included the first five S69 (“1500”) (LNER B12) class 4-6-0 as well as Y14 (LNER J15), E72 (LNER J18) 0-6-0 and G69 (LNER F6) 2-4-2T locomotives. A total of 82 new carriages were built in 1912 with 51 main line and 31 suburban carriages being built. Additionally a total of 75 non-passenger (Note: This refers to stock that worked as part of passenger train formations rather than goods (freight) traffic.) vehicles were also constructed including horse boxes, six wheel carriage vans and an elephant van! How many elephants were carried by the latter vehicle is not known.

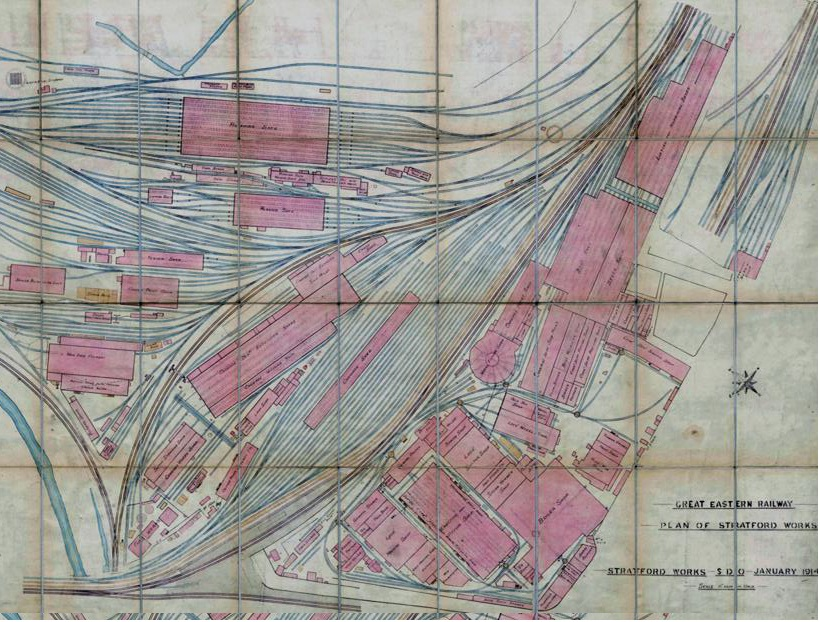
Railway lines around Stratford with associated works and engine sheds (1914)

During World War I the works undertook war work including munitions manufacture and building a hospital train for the army. At the beginning of the war the superintendent for the works identified that the works was already pressed to meet the requirements of the Great Eastern Railway and requested the building of a new locomotive repair facility. With a predicted up-turn in rail traffic likely, this request clearly resonated with the authorities and the Engine Repair Shed, situated on the far western side of Stratford TMD, was opened in 1915.

In addition to its usual load the works overhauled eight Caledonian Railway 0-6-0 locomotives.

One of the more unusual tasks the works undertook in the war was the construction of henhouses for the GER farm at Bentley, Suffolk. each of which had a works number.

Late in the war during 1918 Stratford Works repaired two Belgian locomotives. These had been evacuated to France in 1914 when the Germans invaded the country (a total of 250 engines were in fact evacuated) and had been used in France by the Railway Operating Division. They were both 0-6-0 locomotives.

In a six-month period in 1920 the works undertook 216 heavy locomotive repairs, 40 rebuilds and 11 new locomotives were built.

==== Facilities at grouping (1921) ====
In 1921 the offices were located in front of the main works. As well as housing administrative and managerial staff there were draughtsmen working under the Chief Mechanical Engineer. These were destroyed by an incendiary bomb in World War II.

The Great Eastern Railway produced a number of booklets about the works; the 1921 issue was reproduced in 1991 to mark the closure of the works. This booklet also covered the wagon works at Temple Mills. The table below lists the workshops (described here as shops) and departments of the works in 1921.

Department/Shop	Location	Notes
Erecting and Fitting Shop	Original site	Built 1847 this shop was 350 feet long by 142 feet wide and could accommodate up to 50 engines.
Westinghouse Brake Shop	Original site	Manufacture and repair of power brakes for locomotives and rolling stock
Brass Finishing Shop	Original site	Dealt with manufacture and repair of whistles, valves and copper firebox stays
Chemical Laboratory Shop	Original site	Equipped to undertake chemical tests for both the works and other GE departments.
Testing House	Original site	Covered 6,300 square feet and was where hooks, chains, boiler plates and even rubber were tested.
Spring Shop	Original site	132 feet long by 40 feet wide and was where locomotive springs were manufactured.
Smithy	Original site	This shop was 136 feet long by 132 feet wide included steam hammers, nut, bolt and riveting machines as well as a Thomson Electric Butt Welder.
The Steam Hammer Shop	Original site	140 feet long by 71 feet wide and known as the forge. This contained 6 furnaces, and two steam boilers which were used to heat the shops during winter.
Loco Wheel Shop	Original site	190 feet long by 70 feet wide in two bays. Used for the production of locomotive wheels.
Axle Box Shop	Original site	104 feet long by 49 feet wide used in the production of locomotive axle boxes
Rotunda	Original site	Used as a wheel fitting shop this was the original roundhouse (also known as the Polygon). This activity ceased c1949.
Boiler shop	Original site	The main building consisting of 6 bays measured 212 feet by 139 feet whilst extensions for boiler mounting and light plating measured 230x100 feet and 74x46 feet respectively. This shop was hit by bombs in April 1941.
Hydraulic installation	Original site	Two sets of steam driven pumps supplying water to the works.
Tool Shop	Original site	5,000 square feet - responsible for the tools used throughout the Great Eastern
Machine Shop	Original site	Consisted of 5 bays producing amongst other things locomotive cylinders, side rods and connecting rods.
Coppersmiths Shop	Original site	Adjacent to the machine shop this was a lofty building of 4,880 square feet.
Brass Foundry	Original site	Also within this area (9,200 square feet) at this time were the white metalling shop and brass and copper pipe stores. There were 12 coke fired "pot hole" furnaces and 1 tilt furnace. During World War 1 this area was used to produce copper shell bands, fuse sticks etc.
New Iron Foundry and Pattern Shop	Original site	Completed in 1912 covering 41,000 square feet this shop could turn out 85 tons of castings each week. This shop was hit by bombs in World War 2 and was rebuilt. In later years it was used for crane repairs and locomotives were broken up here.
Boiler repairing and tube shop	Original site	In this shop and adjoining yard locomotive boilers were stripped and prepared for acceptance by the boiler shop.
Tender shop	Original site	Had 3 pits running along its length with capacity to repair 20 tenders.
Engine Paint shop	Original site	Was a "weaver roofed" building consisting of six roads. Locomotives would work a trial trip after repair (or building) and if satisfactory would then be painted.
Engine Repairing Shop	Far west side of Stratford TMD adjacent to the Channelsea Loop	From opening in 1915 this was where locomotives received lighter repairs. It could accommodate 40 locomotives at a time. During World War 1 the shed was used for munitions work and some 2,279,000 shell forgings were produced. It was also the last part to the works to remain open, closing in 1991.

There were two separate carriage works . These were known as CD1 and CD2. CD1 was to the north of the original site whilst CD2 was on the High Meads site linked together by a tunnel under the Lea Bridge line. CD1 was expanded in the late 1840s and again in the early 1860s.

===== Carriage works CD1 =====
Department/Shop	Dimensions	Notes
Main Saw Mill	270 x 66 feet	Almost all carriages at this point were largely constructed of wood so the saw mill played a prominent part in the works production process.
Carriage Body Shop	50,000 square feet	In 1921 this was dealing with 10 new build carriages and 14 heavy repairs at any one time.
Stock Shop	30,000 square feet	Carriage repair and painting - this and the carriage body shop were served by a traverser.
General Machine Shop	Not known	Repaired carriage iron work .
Carriage Smithy	30,000 square feet	Carriage repair and painting – this and the carriage body shop were served by a traverser.
Trimming Shop	Above the general machine shop	Cushions, door straps and internal carriage fittings were made up here.
Hair Shop	Above the general machine shop	Where the horse hair used for upholstery was cleaned.
Sewing Machine Shop	Above the general machine shop?	All carriage linings were made here. Women were employed in this role (and probably in the above two shops) and had separate dining facilities to the male workers.
Polishing Shops	Above the general machine shop?	Where mirrors and photograph frames for carriages were polished having been produced in the adjacent Frame shop. All work here and in the sewing machine shop was undertaken by women who also had a separate dining hall and used a different entrance to the works.
Lifting Shop	2 roads 484 feet long	Located on the opposite side of the traverser mentioned above and had two cranes capable of lifting 15 tons each. This shop was hit by bombs on 9 October 1940 during the London Blitz
Road Van Shops	100 x 73 feet (main shop)	1,375 road vehicles and 15,500 barrows were repaired here – there was also a paint shop and associated stores.

===== Carriage works CD2 =====
Department/Shop	Dimensions	Notes
Carriage Wheel Shop	Unknown	Production and repair of carriage wheels.
Smithy Stamping Shop	Unknown	Produced coupling nuts, brake screws, etc.
Carriage Repairing Shop	500 x 96 feet	Could accommodate 5 suburban trains at any one time. A row of smaller shops each 24 feet wide and running the length of the shed contained stores, trimming shop, light woodworking shop, etc.
Log Saw Mill	not known	adjoins the Carriage Repairing Shed.
New Carriage Paint Shop	420 x 40 feet	Located north of CD1 this was under construction in 1921 and was expected to be a complete set of carriage shops (CD3?). There were 2 sets of 2 roads separated by an 18" gauge tramway line. Headroom was 20 feet. These were served by stores measuring 77 x 40 feet.

===== Other railway departments in the Stratford area (1921) =====
- Drawing Office - there were two separate offices until 1930. One dealt with rolling stock the other with plant, buildings etc.
- Signalling and Permanent Way (Leyton)
- Printing shop (adjacent Stratford Market station)
- Lamp repairs
- Building Department
- Mechanics Institute
- Electric Light and Power (near CD2)
- Millwrights (near CD2)

There was a goods yard east of Stratford station called Angel Lane.

===== Power =====
The Great Eastern had a generating station that served the works and depot with sub-stations at the engine repair shop, Temple Mills wagon works and various sub stations on the original site. The supply was three-phase 50 Hz alternating current which was supplied at 6,000 volts before being transformed down to 440 volts.

There was also an oil gas works on site near CD2. Whilst the Great Eastern was fitting electric lighting to most of its carriages, it still had 4,000 lit by The gas works was established in 1877 using the Pintsch principle system and initially capable of supplying gas for 200 carriages. Whilst the principal gassing point was at Stratford suburban outposts such as Wood Street, Enfield and Alexandra Palace all had equipment to allow carriages to be supplied by gas. The gas itself was moved in tank wagons from the plant at Stratford and then attached to distribution pipes at those locations. In 1880 the use of gas was extended to the Loughton line which resulted in an expansion of the plant and again in 1883 when the Blackwall and North Woolwich line carriages were converted. The GER was keen to convert main line stock and during 1890/1891 the gas works was further extended with Parkeston Quay becoming the first location outside the suburban area to have gassing facilities. Between 1892 and 1912 a fleet of 41 four wheel gas tank wagons were built for distributing gas to outlying stations. Gas mains were laid to Ilford and Tottenham in 1900. Gas continued to light suburban and branch line carriages and be used in kitchen and restaurant cars until the 1950s with the plant closing in 1960.

==== Locomotive superintendents ====
The locomotive superintendents of the Great Eastern Railway were:

- 1862–1866 Robert Sinclair
- 1866–1873 Samuel W. Johnson
- 1873–1878 William Adams
- 1878–1881 Massey Bromley
- 1881–1885 Thomas William Worsdell
- 1885–1907 James Holden
- 1908–1912 S. D. Holden
- 1912–1922 Alfred John Hill – Chief Mechanical Engineer from 1915

The Works Manager between 1881 and 1898 was George Macallan (15 December 1837 -28 May 1913) who had first been employed by the Eastern Counties Railway in 1854 and with the exception of a six-year posting in Cambridge had worked in a succession of posts at Stratford. He invented the Macallan blastpipe with an associate Charles Adams, which was patented in 1888 and fitted to around 700 GER locomotives. Other railways also fitted the device included the Great Northern Railway, Great North of Scotland Railway and the Furness Railway.

=== London and North Eastern Railway era (1923-1948) ===
At the grouping in 1923, the works passed to the London and North Eastern Railway. Locomotive-building ceased soon afterwards but the works continued to do repairs and maintenance. The last locomotives built on the site were N7 0-6-2T engines. Construction of carriages to GER designs ceased in 1923 with the completion of a batch of coaches for Ilford services, and all carriage construction ceased after 1927 although repairs of carriages used on the Great Eastern section of the LNER continued and new equipment dedicated to this was installed progressively between 1927 and 1931.

During World War II artillery parts and aircraft components were manufactured by the works. These included parts for tanks, landing craft, coastal defence guns, 2-pounder guns, Hotchkiss Machine Guns, forgings for mortar bomb, valves for oil tankers and parts for road vehicles.

The works was hit several times during the London Blitz and by a V2 rocket later in the war.

During the Second World War eight US Army Class S160 2-8-0s were accepted into service on the works (couplings fitted, motion attached, wheels reprofiled) during 1943. Other members of the class were accepted at other works throughout the UK. The locomotives were employed on freight trains in the run up to the invasion of Europe during 1943 and 1944.

In 1947, 2,032 men were employed in the works.

=== British Railways era (1948-1991) ===
The works passed to British Railways in 1948.

The Polygon which up until stage was thought to be used as a wheel fitting shop was closed and demolished in 1949.

The original site ceased operation in 1963 whilst the 1915 shed became a Diesel locomotive repair shop, about the same time, as British Railways had learned lessons with regard to maintaining diesel locomotives in steam sheds. In the 1980s many older diesel classes were 'cannibalised' (stripped for spares) at the works to keep other locomotives operational. The diesel repair shop finally closed on 31 March 1991 and the preserved L77 (LNER N7) 0-6-2T, the last locomotive built at Stratford, was on site during the final week of operation along with a Class 40 diesel (which worked on the Great Eastern Main line in the late 1950s and early 1960s).

In the 1970s, part of the site became the Stratford London International Freight Terminal with a number of large warehouses some of which were rail connected. There was also a Freightliner terminal on the west side of the Channelsea Loop Line.

In the 1990s, the site was earmarked for the new Stratford International station and the Westfield Stratford City shopping centre which opened in 2011.

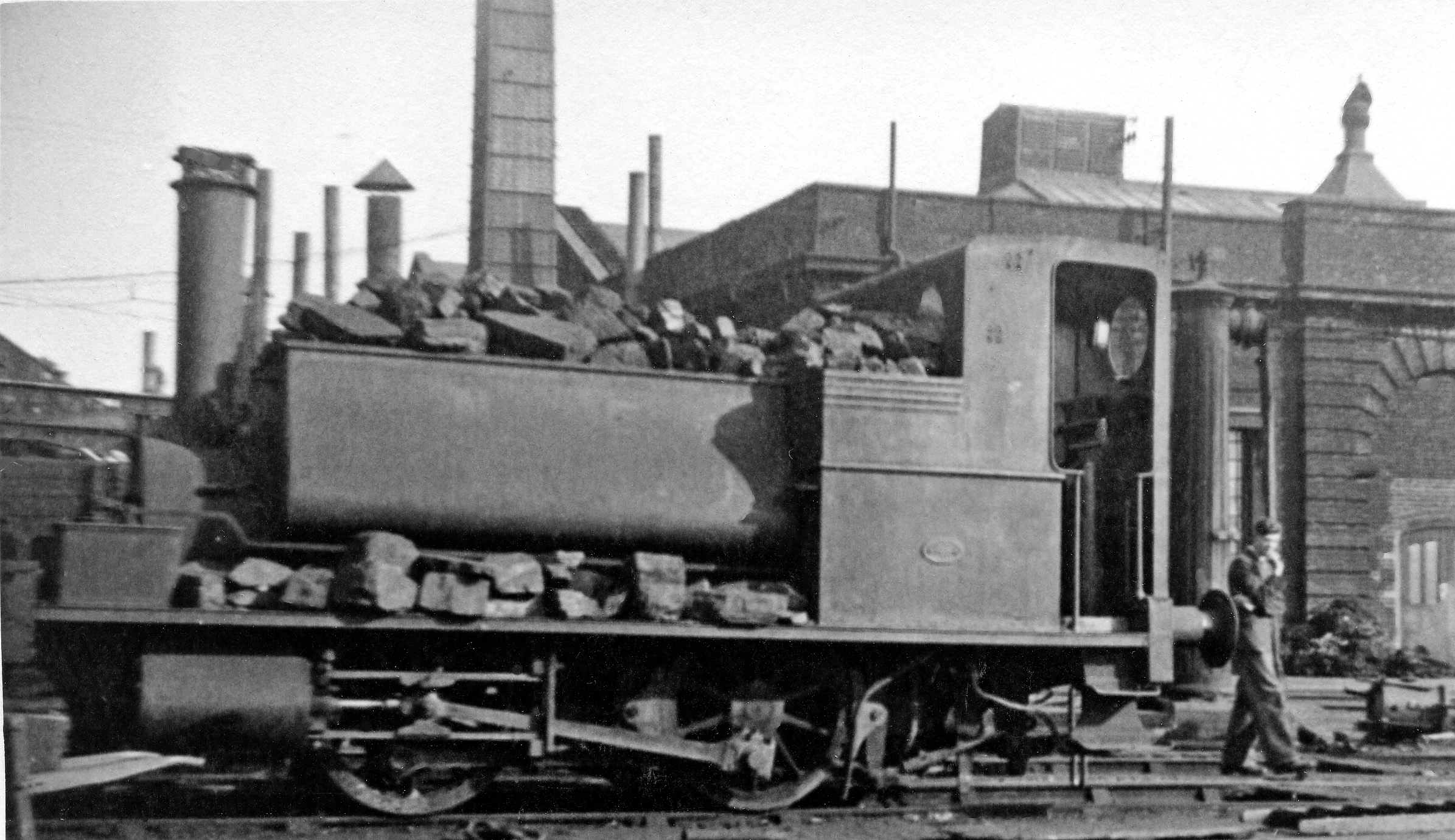
Works shunter Y5 outside Stratford Locomotive works (1946)

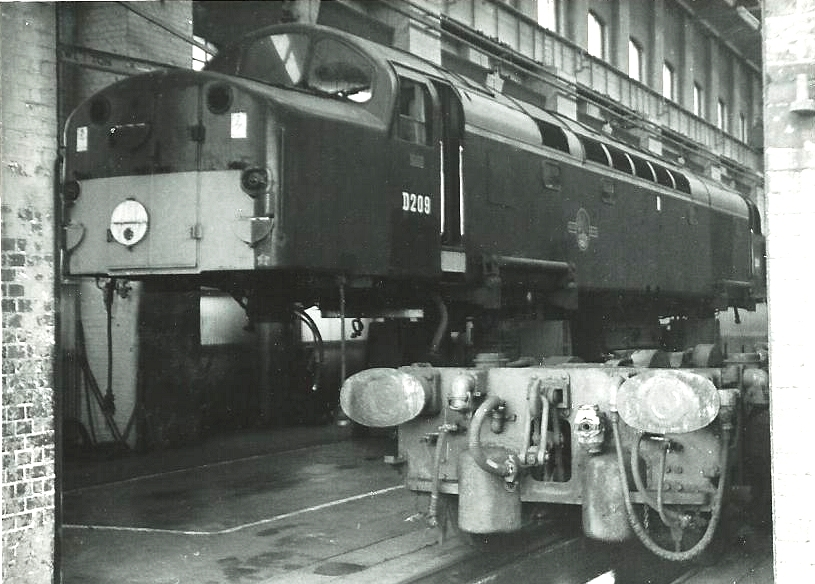
English Electric Type 4 D209 under repair (1967)

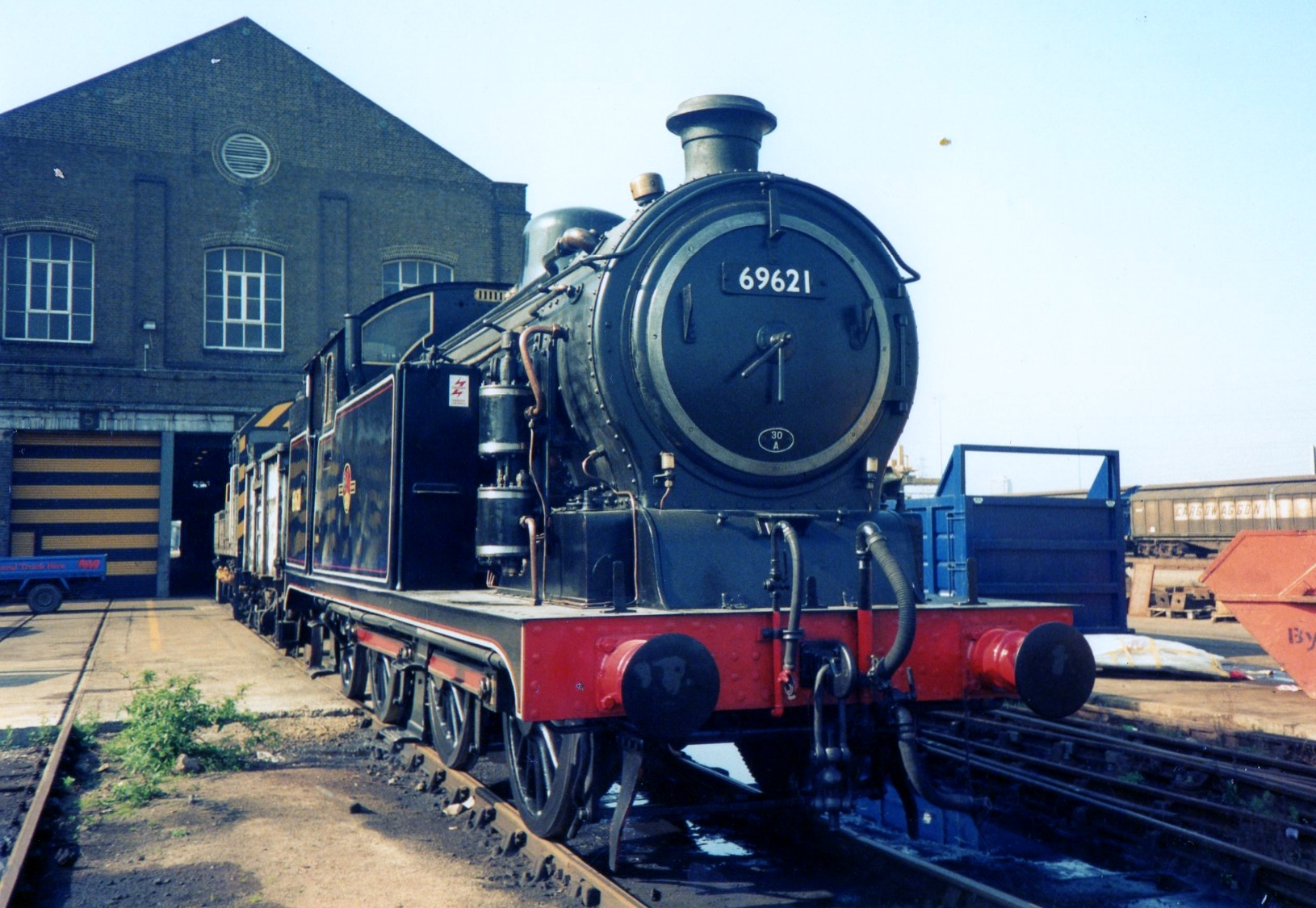
N7 0-6-2T locomotive outside Stratford Works DRS (1991)

== Works locomotives ==
Stratford Works had a small fleet of engines that undertook shunting and lifting duties at the works. These included:

Number/Letter	wheel arrangement	At site between	Notes
A	0-4-0ST	1872–1921	Manning Wardle H class built 1872 for GE as no 200. The locomotive was named The Chairman although the name was removed in 1894. The locomotive was withdrawn in 1921 and cut up in 1923.
GER 281	0-6-0T	1886-1962	Holden T18 class (LNER J66) locomotive introduced as an oil burning locomotive (the first on the GER system) although it had this removed in the late 1880s. It was then refitted with oil burning equipment in 1893 and retained this until 1904 when oil burning was abandoned by Holden. 281 was not renumbered into the works series becoming LNE 7271 and in the 1946 renumbering 8370 and then British Railways 63840. It was renumbered Departmental number 32 in 1952 and then remained working to the end of steam in East Anglia in 1962.
B, C, D	0-6-0T	1891–93 to 1950–52	GER Class 204 (LNER Z4, later J92) 0-6-0T locomotives built by Ruston, Proctor and Company in 1868 converted to a crane tank in 1891–93. Following the provision of an overhead crane in the tender shop in the 1930s the cranes fell into disuse and the chains were subsequently removed.
GER 209 (LNER 7209)	0-4-0T	1874 - 1926	Purchased for works use in 1874 from Neilson and Company(Glasgow)
GER 210	0-4-0T	1875 - 1914	Purchased for works use in 1874 from Neilson and Company (Glasgow)
GER 210 (LNE 7210)	0-4-0T	1921-1963	The second loco to carry this number this was a Class B74 (LNER Y4) 0-4-0T built at Stratford in 1921. Renumbered 68129 by British Railways and then as departmental number 33 in 1952 it was the last of the class and survived until the closure of the works in 1963.
GER 228 (LNER 7228)	0-4-0T	1919-1923	Another Neilson and Company locomotive built 1876 becoming a member of GER Class 209 (later LNER Y5). It became a brake testing loco for the Carriage Works at Stratford between 1919 and 1923 before returning to goods shunting duties at Canning Town or Devonshire Street sidings. For a brief period in 1922 it and sister locomotive GER 230 worked the Port of London Authority's Millwall Extension Railway between Millwall Junction and North Greenwich. Withdrawn in 1927.
GER 229 (LNER 7229)	0-4-0T	1911-1916	Another Neilson and Company locomotive built 1876 becoming a member of GER Class 209 (later LNER Y5). It became the brake testing loco for the Carriage Works at Stratford between 1911 and 1916 and was then sold into industrial use c1917. The locomotive still exists and in 2017 was noted as being under restoration.
GER 230 (LNER 7230)	0-4-0T	1916–1948	This ex-GE curiosity, built in 1903 as No. 230 (LNER 7230, then renumbered LNER 8081 and BR 68081) was a survivor of eight diminutive GER Class 209 (LNER Y5) 0-4-0T locomotives used for work in awkward places. It became the brake testing loco for the Carriage Works at Stratford in 1916.The loco remained at the works for the rest of its career and during the 1930s it was frequently paired with a former Eastern Counties Railway carriage and displayed at LNER open days. It was withdrawn in April 1948 (and its doubtful it carried its British Railways number.
LNER 985	0-4-0T	1946-1952	LNER Y7 class. Renumbered to 8088 in 1946 and 68088 in 1948 this locomotive was built for the NER at Darlington Works and had spent a much of its life working in Hull docks. This was a North Eastern Railway H class locomotive and is preserved at the North Norfolk Railway (although in 2012 it was reported on loan at Beamish museum and in 2015 on the Epping Ongar Railway). Between 1952 and preservation in 1964 the locomotive worked at Bentinck Colliery in Nottinghamshire.

== Preserved locomotives ==
Image	GER No.	GER Class	Type	Serial No.	Date	Notes
	490	T26	2-4-0	836	January; 1895	BR 62785. Static exhibit, National Collection; on loan to Bressingham Steam and Gardens.
	87	S56	0-6-0T	1249	September; 1904	BR 68633. Static exhibit, National Collection; on loan to Bressingham Steam and Gardens.
	1217	G58	0-6-0	1270	May; 1905	BR 65567. Static exhibit, National Collection; on loan to Barrow Hill Roundhouse
	564	Y14	0-6-0	1506	March; 1912	BR 65462. Owned by the Midland and Great Northern Joint Railway Society on the North Norfolk Railway.
	LNER; 7999	N7 (GER L77)	0-6-2T	1702	March; 1924	BR 69621. Owned by the East Anglian Railway Museum. On static display, awaiting overhaul to working order, as of May 2019.
