= List of shipwrecks in 1906 (July–December) =

The list of shipwrecks in 1906 (July–December) includes ships sunk, foundered, grounded, or otherwise lost during the last six months of 1906.

table of contents
1906
Jan	Feb	Mar	Apr
May	Jun	Jul	Aug
Sep	Oct	Nov	Dec
Unknown date

== July ==
=== 2 July ===
List of shipwrecks: 2 July 1906
Ship	State	Description
Mary G. Powers	United States	The 133-gross register ton schooner sank off Newfoundland. All eight people on board survived.

=== 3 July ===
List of shipwrecks: 3 July 1906
Ship	State	Description
Hanover	United States	The 23-gross register ton schooner was stranded at Point Lookout, Maryland. Both people on board survived.
Salem	Russia	The 847-ton vessel was wrecked off Abo, Russia.
Samuel R. Waite	United States	The 39-gross register ton schooner was stranded at Cove Point, Virginia. All five people on board survived.
Valdivia	Argentina	The 3,443-ton vessel was wrecked at Mocha.
Viking	Norway	The 1,420-ton vessel was wrecked 61 miles (98 km) north of Olga Bay.

=== 4 July ===
List of shipwrecks: 4 July 1906
Ship	State	Description
Ella G. Eells	United States	The 256-gross register ton schooner was stranded on Libby Island on the coast of Maine with the loss of four lives. There was one survivor.
George Edwin	United States	The 99-gross register ton schooner sank in the Bay of Fundy off Grand Manan, New Brunswick. All four people on board survived.
Kingston	United States	The 1,070-gross register ton schooner barge or scow barge sank off Shinnecock, New York, with the loss of one life. There were two survivors.
Louise Anna	France	The 149-ton sailing vessel was abandoned in the Atlantic Ocean.
Unknown car float	United States	The car float was sunk at dock when struck by barges that got out of control due to an eddy current off Rivington Street, New York City, in the East River.
Vinland	United States	The 965-gross register ton schooner burned in the East River off Rikers Island in New York City. All five people on board survived.

=== 5 July ===
List of shipwrecks: 5 July 1906
Ship	State	Description
Hugo Keller	United States	The freighter sank at dock at Pier 9S, Port Richmond, Philadelphia, Pennsylvania, when punctured by an obstruction on a falling tide. Raised on 9 July and repaired.

=== 6 July ===
List of shipwrecks: 6 July 1906
Ship	State	Description
Agenor	United States	The 1,487-gross register ton full-rigged ship was stranded at Yukimini, Tokushima Shioku, Japan. All 17 people on board survived.
Gold Star	United States	With no one on board, the 168-ton barge was wrecked in the Tanana River at Tanana, District of Alaska.
Keewaydin	Canada	The schooner was sunk in a collision off Tarpaulin Cove.
Plunket	United Kingdom	The schooner sprung a leak in Lake Ontario and was beached, probably in the area of Oswego, New York.
Somerset	United States	The wrecking steamer sank at dock at Lewes, Delaware. Raised and inspected, Certificate of Inspection revoked for being in unsafe condition due to rotten timbers.

=== 7 July ===
List of shipwrecks: 7 July 1906
Ship	State	Description
Hanna	Norway	The 311-ton vessel was wrecked at Cape Langenaes, Iceland.
R. L. Aubrey	United States	The steamer struck a submerged object and sank in the Ohio River near Eighteen Mile Island.

=== 8 July ===
List of shipwrecks: 8 July 1906
Ship	State	Description
Duplin	United States	The steamer struck a snag and sank in the North East River in North Carolina.
Fishren	United Kingdom	The 938-ton vessel was sunk in a collision with Langdale in fog in the English Channel.
Harlyn	United Kingdom	The 1,453-ton vessel was wrecked near Cape Negro.

=== 9 July ===
List of shipwrecks: 9 July 1906
Ship	State	Description
Cumbrian	United Kingdom	The 1,306-ton vessel was sunk in a collision about 9 miles (14 km) from the Koppergrund lightship, near Stockholm.

=== 10 July ===
List of shipwrecks: 10 July 1906
Ship	State	Description
Eaglet	United States	The 130-gross register ton schooner was lost when she collided with the protected cruiser Jurien de la Gravière (French Navy) in the North River between New York City and New Jersey. All four people on board survived. Wreck removal completed 29 August 1907.

=== 11 July ===
List of shipwrecks: 11 July 1906
Ship	State	Description
Angola	United Kingdom	The Elder Dempster 1,811 GRT steamship was on a voyage from Veracruz, Mexico, to Montreal, Quebec, when she ran aground and was wrecked 6 nautical miles (11 km) east of Louisbourg, Nova Scotia.
Helen L. Martin	United States	The 423-gross register ton schooner was stranded at Point Breeze on the coast of Newfoundland. All seven people on board survived.
Quincy	United States	The steamer took a shear off course in the Mississippi River near Trempealeau, Wisconsin, running her onto shore where a stump holed her hull, sinking her in 20 feet (6.1 m) of water. Later raised, repaired, sold and converted into an excursion boat.

=== 12 July ===
List of shipwrecks: 12 July 1906
Ship	State	Description
Mollie Barton	United States	The 154-gross register ton canal boat was lost in a collision with an unidentified French Navy warship in the Hudson River off New York City. The only person on board survived.
Quincy	United States	The steamer sank in the Mississippi River near Trempealeau, Wisconsin. Raised beginning on 19 August and repaired.
R. L. Myers	United States	The steamer struck a snag in the Tar River and had to be beached for temporary repairs.

=== 13 July ===
List of shipwrecks: 13 July 1906
Ship	State	Description
Shaughraun	United States	The steamer struck a boulder, rolled over and sank at Limekiln Crossing in the Detroit River. Raised the next day.

=== 14 July ===
List of shipwrecks: 14 July 1906
Ship	State	Description
Harald	Norway	The 164-ton fishing vessel was wrecked at Revsnaes, Iceland.

=== 15 July ===
List of shipwrecks: 15 July 1906
Ship	State	Description
Colonel Smith	United Kingdom	The 241-ton fishing vessel foundered in the North Sea.
Isle of Caldy	United Kingdom	The 1,381-ton vessel was sunk in a collision off East Goodwin.

=== 16 July ===
List of shipwrecks: 16 July 1906
Ship	State	Description
Chico	United States	The steamer was wrecked at Shelter Cove, California, a total loss.
Matilda D. Borda	United States	The coal schooner was stranded on Gull Shoals one mile (1.6 km) from the Little Kinnakeet, North Carolina Life Saving Station in smoky weather, a total loss. The crew were rescued by the United States Life Saving Service.

=== 17 July ===
List of shipwrecks: 17 July 1906
Ship	State	Description
Lizzie W. Hunt	United States	The 9-gross register ton schooner was stranded at Isle au Haut in Penobscot Bay on the coast of Maine. All three people on board survived.
Wilhelm and Elise	Sweden	The 186-ton vessel grounded at Christianopel, Sweden. Refloated and condemned at Kalmar.

=== 18 July ===
List of shipwrecks: 18 July 1906
Ship	State	Description
Pokanoket	United States	The steamer sank at dock over night at Petersburg, Virginia, when her sea valves were opened, one man was arrested. Raised 24 July.
Sir Henry	New Zealand	The brigantine was wrecked 1 1/2 miles (2.4 km) from East Cape, New Zealand. Lost with all hands.

=== 20 July ===
List of shipwrecks: 20 July 1906
Ship	State	Description
Abrek	Imperial Russian Navy	1905 Russian Revolution: The Abrek-class torpedo cruiser was run aground to thwart a take over by mutineers at Reval. Later salvaged.
M. L. Thornton	United States	The steamer struck a rock and sank near Lock No. 11 in the Great Kanawha River. Raised and repaired.
Voevoda	Imperial Russian Navy	1905 Russian Revolution: The Kazarskiy-class torpedo cruiser was run aground to thwart a take over by mutineers at Reval. Later salvaged.

=== 21 July ===
List of shipwrecks: 21 July 1906
Ship	State	Description
City of Toledo	United States	The 245-gross register ton schooner was lost when she struck a bridge at Detroit, Michigan. All seven people on board survived.
Cyril	United Kingdom	The 2,294-ton vessel was wrecked in Trepassey Bay, Newfoundland.
Earl of Beaconsfield	United Kingdom	The 141-ton vessel was sunk in a collision off County Down, Ireland, U.K.
Reaper	United States	The 1,468-gross register ton bark burned at Port Ludlow, Washington. All 15 people on board survived.

=== 22 July ===
List of shipwrecks: 22 July 1906
Ship	State	Description
John A. Allen	United States	The 43-gross register ton schooner was lost in a collision with the steam screw ocean liner Vaderland (Belgium) off Georges Bank between the North Atlantic Ocean and the Gulf of Maine. All seven people on board survived.
King Cadwallon	United Kingdom	The 326.2-foot (99.4 m), 3,225-ton vessel was wrecked in fog on the Hard Lewis Rocks, Scilly Islands.
Talis	Sweden	The 870-ton vessel was sunk in a collision with Roman near the Royal Sovereign Lightship.

=== 24 July ===
List of shipwrecks: 24 July 1906
Ship	State	Description
W. B. Castle	United States	The 124-gross register ton tug sank after colliding with the screw steamer Robert Holland (United States) in the Detroit River near Belle Isle in Michigan, a total loss. All eight people on board were rescued by Robert Holland.

=== 25 July ===
List of shipwrecks: 25 July 1906
Ship	State	Description
Diadem	United States	The 67-gross register ton schooner was stranded on Ash Island in Penobscot Bay on the coast of Maine. All three people on board survived.
Gard B. Reynolds	United States	The steamer struck a submerged object while leaving the dock at Pier 12, Port Richmond, Philadelphia, Pennsylvania, and was beached to prevent her from sinking.
Lilly K	United States	With no one on board, the 13-gross register ton motor vessel burned at Sheboygan, Wisconsin.
Loma	United States	The 19-gross register ton schooner was stranded off the New Point Loma Lighthouse at Point Loma, San Diego, California. All six people on board survived.
Vigilant	United Kingdom	The steamer was wrecked eight nautical miles (15 km) south of Roches-Douvres Light.

=== 26 July ===
List of shipwrecks: 26 July 1906
Ship	State	Description
Hokuyu Maru	Japan	The 920-ton vessel was wrecked off Shiriuchi, Hokkaido, Japan.
Maggie Schultz	Belgium	The steamer foundered 80 nautical miles (150 km) off Bilbao, Spain.
Stella B.	Canada	The 100-ton vessel was sunk by an iceberg in the Strait of Belle Isle, Canada.
William Case	United States	The 266-gross register ton schooner sank in Lake Erie 50 nautical miles (93 km; 58 mi) northeast by north of Colchester Light. All six people on board rescued by her tug Saginaw (United States).

=== 27 July ===
List of shipwrecks: 27 July 1906
Ship	State	Description
C. W. Elphicke	United States	The steamer struck the government extension of the breakwater at Cleveland, Ohio, and sank. Raised 23 August, repaired and returned to service.
Era	United States	The 134-gross register ton schooner was stranded at Pointe Plate on Miquelon Island. All 14 people on board survived.

=== 28 July ===
List of shipwrecks: 28 July 1906
Ship	State	Description
Shenandoah	United States	The sloop yacht capsized on Lake Michigan two miles (3.2 km) from the Jackson Park, Illinois Life Saving Station. The crew were rescued by a boat. The United States Life Saving Service towed her into harbor where she was beached.

=== 29 July ===
List of shipwrecks: 29 July 1906
Ship	State	Description
Alva B.	United States	The motor launch broached and capsized crossing the Hereford, New Jersey Bar. Survivors were rescued by the power boat Israella (United States), and auxiliary sloop Fanny E. Moffat (United States).
Kilmore	United Kingdom	The 2,215-ton vessel was sunk in a collision near West Hinder Lightship.
Nora	United States	The motor sloop broached and capsized crossing the Hereford, New Jersey Bar. Survivors rescued by the United States Life Saving Service, power boat Violet, and a skiff.
Valentine	United States	The steamer struck a submerged log and sank in Mullett Lake. One passenger died.

=== 30 July ===
List of shipwrecks: 30 July 1906
Ship	State	Description
Marjorie J. Sumner	Canada	The schooner capsized at Eatonville, Nova Scotia, during unloading. Subsequently salvaged, repaired and returned to service.
Sanquoit	United States	The sloop yacht ran ashore in thick fog and was wrecked in the area of the Jerrys Point, New Hampshire Life Saving Station. The crew reached shore on an air mattress.

=== 31 July ===
List of shipwrecks: 31 July 1906
Ship	State	Description
Earl Dunraven	United Kingdom	The 1,310-ton vessel was wrecked 4 miles (6.4 km) east northeast of Viuda Island.
Socoa	France	Socoa aground off Cadgwith. Plumes of steam from pumps being used to refloat her can be seen. The three-masted full-rigged sailing ship was stranded off Kildonan Point, Lizard Point, in dense fog. She was re-floated after jettisoning 50,000 barrels of cement and beached in Cadgwith Cove. She was later towed round to Falmouth and repaired.
Unknown	United States	A motor launch broke loose from her moorings at Orleans, Massachusetts, eventually drifting ashore and was wrecked. Her machinery and equipment was salvaged.

=== Unknown date ===
List of shipwrecks: Unknown date 1906
Ship	State	Description
Chico	United States	The 362-gross register ton screw steamer ran aground and was wrecked at Shelter Cove, California, on either 16 or 18 July (sources disagree). All 17 people on board survived.
Margarita	Uruguay	The 550-ton vessel was abandoned on fire in the North Atlantic about 9 July.

== August ==
=== 1 August ===
List of shipwrecks: 1 August 1906
Ship	State	Description
Gertrude	United States	The steamer struck a snag and sank in the Apalachicola River above Mary's Landing. Later raised.
USS Nero	United States Navy	The collier ran aground 1,800 yards (1,600 m) off the south coast Block Island in dense fog. Refloated by tugs.
Thomas Newton	United States	The steamer sank in shallow water when struck by the barge Mars, under tow by Frank K. Esherick (United States), in the Pasquotank River. After sinking, her cargo of lime caught fire and she burned to the water level.

=== 3 August ===
List of shipwrecks: 3 August 1906
Ship	State	Description
John J. Hagan	United States	The steamer sank at dock at Pier 8, Port Richmond, Philadelphia, Pennsylvania, over night. The only crewman on board was killed.

=== 4 August ===
List of shipwrecks: 4 August 1906
Ship	State	Description
Sirio	Italy	Painting Wreckage of the Sirio, by Benedito Calixto. The passenger steamer was wrecked on the Punta Hormigas, a reef off Hormigas Island east of Cape Palos, Cartagena, Spain, with the loss of at least 150 – and perhaps as many as 400 – lives. The steamer Marie Louise (France) and the merchant ships Joven Migeul and Vicente Llicano (both flag unknown) were among ships rescuing survivors.
Unknown launch	United States Navy	The steam launch, belonging to USS Newark (United States Navy), was sunk in a collision with the tug T. A. Scott, Jr. (United States) in the harbor of New Haven, Connecticut.

=== 5 August ===
List of shipwrecks: 5 August 1906
Ship	State	Description
Hamlet	Norway	The 117.4-foot (35.8 m) 380-ton brig was wrecked at Hesselø, Læsø, Denmark. Her crew took to her lifeboat, but it capsized killing 5 of the 8 crew.
Irene	United States	The 650-ton barge foundered in the outer harbor at St. Michael, District of Alaska, when her seams opened while she was alongside the steamer San Mateo (United States) to take on cargo. The vessel City (United States) towed the partially sunken barge – with 300 tons of hay and general merchandise aboard – into the inner harbor, where she grounded.
Naka Maru	Japan	The 980-ton vessel was sunk in a collision entering the harbor at Shimonoseki.
Sverre	Sweden	The laid up 381-ton vessel was wrecked 2 miles from Slite, Gotland, Sweden.

=== 6 August ===
List of shipwrecks: 6 August 1906
Ship	State	Description
Falcon	United States	The 43-gross register ton screw steamer burned to the waterline while tied up at a dock in Houghton, Washington. All five people on board survived.
Falcon	United States	The 74-gross register ton screw steamer burned at Houghton, Washington. All five people on board survived.
George V. Jordan	United States	The 616-gross register ton schooner was stranded on Pollock Rip Shoal four miles (6.4 km) from the Monomoy Point Life Saving Station on 6 or 7 August, eventually sinking in 3 fathoms (18 ft; 5.5 m) of water. Wreck removed with dynamite between 12 October and 9 November. All eight people on board were rescued by the United States Life Saving Service.

=== 7 August ===
List of shipwrecks: 7 August 1906
Ship	State	Description
Forth	United Kingdom	The 513-ton steamer ran aground in thick fog and was wrecked on Long Pierre Rock off Herm, Channel Islands, whilst on passage from Middlesbrough to St. Malo.
Harlem River	United States	The tug was sunk when struck by the tug Margaret D. (United States) in the Harlem River off One Hundred Twenty Fifth Street causing her to list to the point of filling with water and sinking. Later raised.

=== 8 August ===
List of shipwrecks: 8 August 1906
Ship	State	Description
Lucille	United States	The 71-gross register ton screw steamer sank in Lake Erie 4 nautical miles (7.4 km) off West Sister Island after losing the packing from her stuffing box, creating a leak that the pumps could not handle. All five people on board survived. She later was raised.

=== 9 August ===
List of shipwrecks: 9 August 1906
Ship	State	Description
Evelina	Russia	The 289-ton vessel was stranded at Markets Hallar. Refloated for scrapping.

=== 10 August ===
List of shipwrecks: 10 August 1906
Ship	State	Description
Brooklyn	United States	The steamer ran aground on rocks off the breakwater at Pointe Delgarde, St. Michaels, The Azores. Refloated on 21 August and sailed to Lisbon for repairs.
Cornelia	United States	The 60-gross register ton schooner sank in Back Creek in Virginia. All three people on board survived.
John H. Pauly	United States	The 197-gross register ton steam barge caught fire while tied up at a dock at Marine City, Michigan, but was cut loose drifting out into a storm beyond reach of the City Fire Department, a total loss. All eight people on board survived.

=== 11 August ===
List of shipwrecks: 11 August 1906
Ship	State	Description
Bulgaria	United States	The barge sprung a leak on Lake Michigan and was beached near the Plum Island Life Saving Station.

=== 12 August ===
List of shipwrecks: 12 August 1906
Ship	State	Description
De Ruyter	Netherlands	The 1,682-ton vessel sank off Helsing Fors after striking a wreck.
Joseph L. Hurd	United States	The steamer sprung a leak 20 miles (32 km) north east of Grosse Point, Michigan. The crew abandoned ship after the pumps could not keep up with the leak. She was towed by tugs to Chicago, Illinois where she sank in a slip. Total loss.
Umberto I	Italy	The 766-ton sailing vessel was abandoned in the North Atlantic.

=== 13 August ===
List of shipwrecks: 13 August 1906
Ship	State	Description
Alexander	United States	The 294-gross register ton screw steamer was stranded in the Arctic Ocean at Cape Parry on the coast of the Northwest Territories. All 48 people on board survived.

=== 15 August ===
List of shipwrecks: 15 August 1906
Ship	State	Description
Detroit	United States	The steamer burned to the water's edge at dock at Edgewater Point, Gideon's Bay, Lake Minnetonka. Her captain and mate, only ones aboard, escaped.
Island City	United States	The 423-gross register ton schooner was stranded at Shediac, New Brunswick. All seven people on board survived.
Maggie Todd	United States	The schooner went ashore at Watch Hill, Rhode Island.

=== 17 August ===
List of shipwrecks: 17 August 1906
Ship	State	Description
Ada Warren	United States	The steamer ran aground and capsized in the Sacramento River at Hog Island, California.
Isabella Gill	United States	The 585-gross register ton schooner departed New York City bound for Mayport, Florida, with eight people aboard and was never heard from again.

=== 18 August ===
List of shipwrecks: 18 August 1906
Ship	State	Description
Alexander	United States	The 294-ton steam whaling bark was wrecked at "Chugak" in the District of Alaska, apparently a reference to Shuyak Island in the Kodiak Archipelago.
Cingalese	Norway	The 662-ton sailing vessel ran aground at the Hood Point Lighthouse in East London, South Africa in the Eastern Cape. It was refloated and towed into the harbour, where it was broken up.
J. W. Bennett	United States	The steamer was sunk in a collision with Saugatuck (United States) 11 miles (18 km) north north east of Long Tail Point in Green Bay.

=== 19 August ===
List of shipwrecks: 19 August 1906
Ship	State	Description
Adelphi Sifnio	Greece	The 2,215-ton vessel foundered 45 miles (72 km) west of Algiers, French Algeria.
Ann Thomson	United States	The 252-gross register ton barge sank off Point Lookout on the coast of Maryland. Both people on board survived.
Gov. Smith	United States	The 2,044-gross register ton screw steamer sank after colliding with the steamer Uranus (United States) on Lake Huron off Pointe Aux Barques, Michigan. All 20 people on board survived.
Julia D. Schmidt	United States	The 9-gross register ton schooner sank off Thacher Island on the coast of Massachusetts. The only person on board survived.
Oweene	United States	The 24-gross register ton iron-hulled sloop-rigged yacht burned in Long Island Sound. Both people on board survived.

=== 20 August ===
List of shipwrecks: 20 August 1906
Ship	State	Description
Ardell	United States	The 27-gross register ton schooner sank in Tampa Bay off the coast of Florida. All three people on board survived.
Bat	United States	The 101-gross register ton schooner was stranded in the Bay of Fundy on Grand Manan in New Brunswick. All four people on board survived.
Boston Marine	Canada	The 150-ton vessel stranded near Cape Germain, then floated off and drifted ashore at Cape Tormintine. Dismantled.
Freda	Sweden	The 217-ton vessel was wrecked near Roda Beacon, Oeland, Sweden.
Lanoy	United Kingdom	The 192-ton vessel was wrecked on Gunfleet Sands.
M. H. Morris	United States	The 16-gross register ton schooner sank off Block Island off the coast of Rhode Island. The only person on board survived.
Manchuria	United States	The steamer was stranded on the northeast end of Oahu in the Territory of Hawaii.
Nemo	United States	The 9-gross register ton screw steamer burned at anchor off Point Jefferson, Washington. All three people on board survived.
Princess Irene	United Kingdom	The 763-ton vessel was wrecked at Linney Head, Pembroke.

=== 21 August ===
List of shipwrecks: 21 August 1906
Ship	State	Description
Mary L. Cushing	United States	The 1,658-gross register ton bark was stranded at Mazatlán, Mexico. All 16 people on board survived.
Nemo	United States	The 9-gross register ton screw steamer burned at anchor off Point Jefferson, Washington. All three people on board survived.

=== 23 August ===
List of shipwrecks: 23 August 1906
Ship	State	Description
Case	United States	The steamer sprung a leak and was beached at Port Washington, Wisconsin. Later refloated and taken to Milwaukee for repairs.
Majore	United States	The launch went ashore on Lake Ontario two miles (3.2 km) north west of the Charlotte, New York Life Saving Station. Her machinery was salvaged.
Primrose	United Kingdom	On a journey from her home port of Garston with a cargo of coal, the steamer hit the Low Lee rocks, Mount's Bay in thick fog one mile (1.6 km) from her destination, Newlyn.
Rapid	Norway	The 297-ton vessel was wrecked at Langenaes, Iceland.

=== 24 August ===
List of shipwrecks: 24 August 1906
Ship	State	Description
C. B. Rossell	United States	The 178-gross register ton barge sank in the Chesapeake Bay off Poplar Island in Maryland. All three people on board survived.
C. H. Conover	United States	The freighter was destroyed by fire just south of the Illinois Slip, Chicago, Illinois, when her cargo caught fire. Her crew of 25 escaped.
Princess	Canada	The steamboat foundered off George Island in Lake Winnipeg in Manitoba.

=== 25 August ===
List of shipwrecks: 25 August 1906
Ship	State	Description
Philadelphia	United States	The steamer sank at dock at Pier 39 South, in the Delaware River over night. Raised and found leaky seams was the cause.

=== 27 August ===
List of shipwrecks: 27 August 1906
Ship	State	Description
Concordia	Norway	The 158.5-foot (48.3 m) 676-ton barque caught fire and was abandoned in the Atlantic.
M. H. Perkins	United States	The 76-gross register ton schooner was stranded at Rockport, Massachusetts. All 14 people on board survived.
Rhoda Stewart	United States	The steamer encountered a gale shortly after leaving Cleveland, Ohio. She returned to harbor but suffered a broke steam line resulting in her cutting loose two barges and then being beached. The two barges drifted ashore.

=== 28 August ===
List of shipwrecks: 28 August 1906
Ship	State	Description
Agnes L. Potter	United States	The 279-gross register ton schooner was stranded at Cleveland, Ohio. All five people on board survived.
Celia	United States	The 173-gross register ton screw steamer ran aground in dense fog and was wrecked two miles (3.2 km) south of the Point Pinos Lighthouse, six miles (9.7 km) from Monterey, California. All 20 people on board survived.
William Grandy	United States	The 464-gross register ton schooner barge or scow barge was stranded at Cleveland, Ohio. All four people on board survived.

=== 29 August ===
List of shipwrecks: 29 August 1906
Ship	State	Description
America	United States	The tug was sunk when struck by Lighter No. 228 that had developed a leak and a list to starboard while being towed by the tug Juniata (United States). When the list got to a steep angle part of her cargo of scrap iron slid overboard causing her to turn to port and hitting America. Her crew were rescued by Juniata.
City of Hudson	United States	The 61-gross register ton sternwheel paddle steamer burned to the waterline and sank while tied up at a dock overnight at Brownsville, Minnesota. Both people on board survived.
Clover	France	Recently bought from Gibraltar by French contractor André Boyer, the 108-gross register ton steam tug sank after becoming disabled in strong winds off Cape Salou, Tarragona, Spain. Two men on the launch died.
Hudson	United States	The launch was sunk in a collision with the ferry Red Bank (United States) at Jersey City, New Jersey. Both men on the launch died.
Mildred	United States	The 6-gross register ton cat boat sank after colliding with the sidewheel paddle steamer Nantucket (United States) in the harbor at Nantucket, Massachusetts. Both people on board survived.
Mostyn	United Kingdom	The 122-ton vessel was sunk in a collision off Holyhead, Wales, U.K.

=== 30 August ===
List of shipwrecks: 30 August 1906
Ship	State	Description
C. P. Dixon	United States	The 717-gross register ton schooner departed Philadelphia, Pennsylvania, bound for Fajardo, Puerto Rico, with eight people on board and was never heard from again.
Excelsior	United States	The 348-gross register ton, 138-foot (42.1 m) three-masted schooner was wrecked on Cape Rozhnof (56°N 161°W) at Nelson Lagoon, District of Alaska. Her crew of 19 survived.
Virginia	United States	The 704-gross register ton schooner barge sank off Cape Fear, North Carolina. All five people on board survived.

=== 31 August ===
List of shipwrecks: 31 August 1906
Ship	State	Description
Roi des Belges	Belgium	The 216-ton fishing vessel was wrecked on Corubello Rock, off Villagarcia.
Rosalia	Spain	The 135-ton vessel was wrecked near Cape Penas.
USAT Sheridan	United States Army	The transport ran aground on Barber's Point, Territory of Hawaii. Refloated later and returned to service.
Yaralla	Australia	The 201.8-foot (61.5 m) 482-ton vessel was wrecked on Naselai Reef, Kuba Point near Numbaulau, Fiji after a boiler tube explosion and, later, her towline parted.

=== Unknown date ===
List of shipwrecks: Unknown date in August 1906
Ship	State	Description
Cingalese	Norway	The full-rigged ship was dismasted and abandoned in the Indian Ocean. She was on a voyage from Zanzibar to Hamburg, Germany. Cingalese was later towed in to East London, South Africa, where she was scrapped in 1907.
Bennett	United States	The tug sunk sometime in August off Long Tail Point Light. She was refloated in mid-1907 and taken to Sturgeon Bay.

== September ==
=== 1 September ===
List of shipwrecks: 1 September 1906
Ship	State	Description
Alice M	United States	The 9-gross register ton motor yacht burned at Algonac, Michigan. Both people on board survived.
Annie L. Henderson	United States	The 428-gross register ton schooner burned at Bangor, Maine. All seven people on board survived.
Cavalier	Canada	The 299-ton lumber schooner was wrecked on Chantry Island Reef in Lake Huron. Crew rescued the next morning after spending the night in her rigging.

=== 2 September ===
List of shipwrecks: 2 September 1906
Ship	State	Description
Gipsy	United States	The 11-gross register ton motor vessel was stranded at Rockaway Beach in Queens, New York. All four people on board survived.

=== 3 September ===
List of shipwrecks: 3 September 1906
Ship	State	Description
Hirondelle	France	The 321-ton vessel was wrecked off Morlaix.
Lillie	United States	The 61-gross register ton sternwheel paddle steamer capsized and sank at Trinity, Louisiana. All nine people on board survived, but she was declared a total loss.
Theodore	France	The 176-ton vessel was wrecked at Pourcenaux Rock 2 miles (3.2 km) east of Quemenes.

=== 4 September ===
List of shipwrecks: 4 September 1906
Ship	State	Description
Elina	Norway	The 2,652-ton vessel was wrecked at Baccaro, Nova Scotia.
Lavinia	United States	The steamer sank at Palatka, Florida, on the St. Johns River. Later raised.

=== 5 September ===
List of shipwrecks: 5 September 1906
Ship	State	Description
Unknown scow	United States	The scow, under tow of the tug A. R Skidmore (United States), was sunk in a collision with an unidentified schooner under tow of Cresent (United States) in the East River off Riker's Island, New York City.
Wm. Crosthwaite	United States	The barge sank in a collision with its tow steamer Homer Warren (United States) in Lake Erie off Kellys Island.

=== 6 September ===
List of shipwrecks: 6 September 1906
Ship	State	Description
Alma	Canada	The 65-ton schooner was stranded at Pinette Shoals, Prince Edward Island. Later refloated and returned to service.
Chauncey E. Burk	United States	The 916-gross register ton schooner was stranded at Sandy Point on Great Abaco in the Bahamas. All nine people on board survived.
Nelson Mills	United States	The 391-gross register ton screw steamer sank after colliding with the screw steamer Milwaukee (United States) off McGregor Point in the St. Clair River on the Canada-United States border between Michigan and Ontario. One passenger and one crewman were killed. There were 14 survivors.
Walrus	United States	Carrying her captain, six passengers, and a 600-pound (270 kg) deck cargo of two stoves and two gas tanks, the 9-gross register ton, 30-foot (9.1 m) motor vessel was destroyed by fire in Tongass Narrows in the District of Alaska after a lantern exploded. Two passengers – a six-year-old girl and a 15-year-old girl – were trapped by the fire and burned to death. The captain and the other four passengers escaped in a lifeboat.

=== 7 September ===
List of shipwrecks: 7 September 1906
Ship	State	Description
Gertrude A. Bartlett	United States	The 139.4-foot (42.5 m) 374-ton schooner was abandoned in the Atlantic.
Gosta	Sweden	The 169-ton vessel was abandoned in the North Sea.

=== 8 September ===
List of shipwrecks: 8 September 1906
Ship	State	Description
Emma R	United States	The 251-gross register ton barge sank at New York City The only person on board survived.
Maggie R	United States	The 5-gross register ton catboat was stranded on Gay Head on the coast of Massachusetts. The only person on board survived.
Uhlenhorst	Germany	The 690-ton vessel foundered off Trindelen.

=== 9 September ===
List of shipwrecks: 9 September 1906
Ship	State	Description
Alice	United States	The 72-gross register ton sternwheel paddle steamer sank in the Savannah River in Georgia. All six people on board survived.
Elim	Norway	The 196-ton vessel was wrecked at Thorshavn, Faroe Islands.
Metamora	United States	The 36-gross register ton schooner sank at New Harbor, Maine. Both people on board survived.
Oliver S. Barrett	United States	On the day she departed Port Royal, South Carolina, for a voyage to New York City, the 634-gross register ton schooner capsized at sea with the loss of eight lives. There was one survivor.

=== 10 September ===
List of shipwrecks: 10 September 1906
Ship	State	Description
Irvin	United Kingdom	The 989-ton vessel was wrecked 5 miles (8.0 km) north of Leixoes, Portugal.
Leah	United States	Operating as an inland passenger vessel with 199 people aboard, the 477-gross register ton, 138.7-foot (42.3 m) sternwheel paddle steamer sank after striking a submerged rock or snag in the Yukon River at Quail Island, 40 miles (64 km) below Kaltag, District of Alaska. Her wreck filled with ice and mud over the next eight months and became a total loss.

=== 11 September ===
List of shipwrecks: 11 September 1906
Ship	State	Description
Anna M. Stammer	United States	The 419-gross register ton schooner departed Gulfport, Mississippi, bound for Cartagena, Colombia. She capsized during the voyage with the loss of all eight people on board. She was salvaged and was towed in to Key West, Florida, where she arrived on 11 January 1907.
Lotus	Russia	The 128-ton vessel was wrecked at Fieron, Oscarshamn, Sweden.
Unknown canal boat	United States	A canal boat, under tow of the tug Robert McAllister (United States), was damaged when she struck a submerged log that went through her bottom in the Columbia Basin causing her to fill and be beached near Clinton Street, Brooklyn.

=== 12 September ===
List of shipwrecks: 12 September 1906
Ship	State	Description
Marec	United Kingdom	The 142-ton fishing vessel foundered 80 miles (130 km) off St. Ann's Head.
Semiramis	France	The 137-ton vessel was wrecked at Port Talbot, Wales, U.K.

=== 13 September ===
List of shipwrecks: 13 September 1906
Ship	State	Description
Emanuel	Norway	The 217-ton vessel was wrecked at Sandorbrok, Iceland.
Oregon	United States	The 2,335-gross register ton coastal passenger-cargo ship was wrecked in heavy rain squalls at Cape Hinchinbrook, Hinchinbrook Island, District of Alaska. All 121 people on board survived. A small party took a lifeboat to Valdez, Alaska, to seek help; the remaining 110 people stranded aboard the wreck were rescued by USLHS Columbine ( United States Lighthouse Service). Oregon was declared a total loss.

=== 14 September ===
List of shipwrecks: 14 September 1906
Ship	State	Description
Carl Both	Russia	The 543-ton sailing vessel was abandoned off the Faroe Islands.

=== 15 September ===
List of shipwrecks: 15 September 1906
Ship	State	Description
Chas. B. Packard	United States	The steamer struck an obstruction and sprung a leak three and a half miles (5.6 km) west north west of Middle Ground. She sank seven miles (11 km) west north west of Middle Ground Light before she could be beached. Crew left in boats and were rescued by the barge Harold.
H. B. Tuttle	United States	The steamer sprung a leak and was beached at Marblehead, Ohio, one-half mile (0.80 km) east of the Life Saving Station. Six of her crew removed to shore by the United States Life Saving Service, with seven choosing to remain on board. Refloated on 18 September and towed to Sandusky, Ohio, for repairs where she sank, a total loss. The vessel was raised on 26 June 1907, taken to Detroit where she was dismantled and abandoned in 1908.
Oliver S. Barrett	United States	The 561-ton vessel sank in the North Atlantic.
Virginia H. Hudson	United States	The 579-gross register ton schooner barge or scow barge sank at Hereford, New Jersey. All four people on board survived.

=== 16 September ===
List of shipwrecks: 16 September 1906
Ship	State	Description
Adieu	United States	The yacht foundered in heavy seas on Lake Erie midway between Stony Point, Michigan, and Point Moullee. Her captain and engineer, the only two people on board, were rescued by Maude (United States).
Coat Coal	France	The 479-ton vessel foundered in the English channel.
Morales	Mexico	The schooner sank in a possible hurricane in the Gulf of Campeche. Her Captain and 4 crew were killed, survivors were rescued by "Bosefield" 24 hours later.
Rapidan	United States	The 26-gross register ton schooner burned at Lower East Pubnico, Nova Scotia. All eight people on board survived.
Twilight	United States	The 376-gross register ton schooner capsized in the North Atlantic Ocean 50 nautical miles (93 km; 58 mi) off Charleston, South Carolina, with the loss of six lives. There was one survivor.

=== 17 September ===
List of shipwrecks: 17 September 1906
Ship	State	Description
Cassie F. Bronson	United States	The 1,124-gross register ton schooner was stranded near Cape Fear, North Carolina. All nine people on board survived.
Charles F. Tuttle	United States	The 776-gross register ton schooner sprung a leak then turned on her beams ends and was abandoned off Charleston, South Carolina in a hurricane. All eight people on board were rescued by "Seguranca" 48 hours later.
Daniels Island	United States	The steamer sank at dock in Charleston, South Carolina, when seas washed over her stern in a gale.
Ethel	United States	The 734-gross register ton bark was stranded at Singleton Swash, South Carolina, with the loss of two lives. There were nine survivors.
James D. Dewell	United States	The 603-gross register ton schooner sank in the North Atlantic Ocean off Charleston, South Carolina, with the loss of all seven people on board.
Leslie	United States	The 22-gross register ton motor yacht burned at New Haven, Connecticut. Both people on board survived.
Nelson E. Newbury	United States	The 658-gross register ton schooner sank, or capsized with the derelict vessel drifting ashore on Pea Island, with the loss of six lives in the North Atlantic Ocean off Charleston, South Carolina. There were two survivors.
Ohio	Canada	The 325-ton sailing vessel was wrecked near Cape Hatteras.
R. D. Bibber	United States	The 769-gross register ton schooner was stranded on Frying Pan Shoals, North Carolina, or capsized off Frying Pan Shoals and was beached on the Cape Fear River bar. All five people on board survived.

=== 18 September ===
List of shipwrecks: 18 September 1906
Ship	State	Description
Albatross	Unknown British colony	The 146-ton vessel foundered near Futaunum Pass.
Anna Precht	Russia	The 37.5-metre (123 ft) 398-ton barque was wrecked on Barber Sands in a Force 6 gale. Two crew died, 6 rescued.
Aspenrade	Germany	1906 Hong Kong typhoon: The 973-ton vessel was wrecked on Stonecutter's Island, Hong Kong.
Castellano	United States	1906 Hong Kong typhoon: The steamer went ashore at Hong Kong in a typhoon.
Changsha	British Hong Kong	1906 Hong Kong typhoon: The steamer went ashore at Hong Kong in a typhoon.
Chinkai Maru	Japan	1906 Hong Kong typhoon: The steamer went ashore at Kelleta Island, Hong Kong in a typhoon.
Chum Lee	Unknown	1906 Hong Kong typhoon: The steamer went ashore at Hong Kong in a typhoon.
HMS Dongala	Royal Navy	1906 Hong Kong typhoon: The gunboat went ashore at Hong Kong during a typhoon.
Emma Luyken	Germany	1906 Hong Kong typhoon: The steamer went ashore at Hong Kong in a typhoon.
Fatshan	British Hong Kong	1906 Hong Kong typhoon: The steamer went ashore at Hong Kong in a typhoon.
Fronde	French Navy	Fronde 1906 Hong Kong typhoon: The Arquebuse-class destroyer was wrecked at Hong Kong in a typhoon. Five crew were killed. Later salvaged and returned to service.
Fukaye Maru	Japan	1906 Hong Kong typhoon: The 232-ton vessel foundered off Wanchai.
H. B. Tuttle	United States	The steamer sank at Sandusky, Ohio, after arriving for repairs. Later raised, repaired and returned to service.
Hermania	Unknown	1906 Hong Kong typhoon: The steamer went ashore at Hong Kong in a typhoon.
Hoi Cheong	Unknown British colony	1906 Hong Kong typhoon: The 461-ton vessel was wrecked at Hong Kong.
Keung Shan	Unknown	1906 Hong Kong typhoon: The steamer went ashore at Hong Kong in a typhoon.
Kongmoon	Unknown	1906 Hong Kong typhoon: The steamer was sunk at Hong Kong in a typhoon.
Kong Nam	Unknown British colony	1906 Hong Kong typhoon: The 501-ton vessel was wrecked at Hong Kong.
Monteagle	United Kingdom	1906 Hong Kong typhoon: The steamer went ashore at Hong Kong in a typhoon.
Nellie Floyd	United States	The 457-gross register ton schooner sank with the loss of her Captain in the North Atlantic Ocean 18 nautical miles (33 km) southwest of Frying Pan Shoals Light off the coast of North Carolina. There were six survivors.
Pak Hong	British Hong Kong	1906 Hong Kong typhoon: The steamer went ashore at Hong Kong in a typhoon.
Pak Kang	Unknown British colony	1906 Hong Kong typhoon: The 434-ton vessel was wrecked at Hong Kong.
Petrarch	Germany	Petrarch 1906 Hong Kong typhoon: The steamer went ashore at Hong Kong in a typhoon.
HMS Phoenix	Royal Navy	HMS Phoenix 1906 Hong Kong typhoon: The Phoenix-class steel screw sloop foundered alongside a coaling pier in Hong Kong during a typhoon.
San Cheung	Unknown	San Cheung 1906 Hong Kong typhoon: The steamer was sunk at Hong Kong in a typhoon.
San Rosario	Unknown	1906 Hong Kong typhoon: The steamer went ashore at Hong Kong in a typhoon.
Sexta	Germany	1906 Hong Kong typhoon: The steamer went ashore at Hong Kong in a typhoon.
Signal	Germany	1906 Hong Kong typhoon: The steamer went ashore at Hong Kong in a typhoon.
Slava	Unknown	1906 Hong Kong typhoon: The steamer went ashore at Hong Kong in a typhoon.
Sorsogon	United States	1906 Hong Kong typhoon: The steamer was sunk at dock at Hong Kong in a typhoon.
S. P. Hitchcock	United States	1906 Hong Kong typhoon: The schooner was sunk, or stranded, at Hong Kong in a typhoon. Refloated and condemned.
Sun on	British Hong Kong	1906 Hong Kong typhoon: The steamer went ashore at Hong Kong in a typhoon.
Takhing	British Hong Kong	1906 Hong Kong typhoon: The steamer went ashore at Hong Kong in a typhoon.
Wing Chai	British Hong Kong	1906 Hong Kong typhoon: The steamer went ashore at Hong Kong in a typhoon.

=== 19 September ===
List of shipwrecks: 19 September 1906
Ship	State	Description
Austria	United Kingdom	The 1,050-ton sailing vessel was abandoned in the Atlantic Ocean.
Charles B. Packard	United States	The steamer struck the wreck of Armenia (United States) in a gale on Lake Erie four miles (6.4 km) off the lighthouse at Pelee Island, Ontario (41°00′N 82°58′W) in seven fathoms (42 ft; 13 m) of water.
Edna Wallace Hopper	United States	The 136-gross register ton motor vessel was stranded in Port au Port Bay on the coast of Newfoundland. All 15 people on board survived.
Hanover	United States	The motor vessel struck a submerged object and sank at Bethlehem, Indiana. Later raised.
Leah	United States	The 477-gross register ton sterwnheel paddle steamer struck a rock or snag off Quail Island in the Yukon River and sank 40 miles (64 km) below Kaltag, District of Alaska. She was declared a total loss. All 199 people on board survived.
Princess	Canada	The steamer was wrecked on a reef in Lake Winnipeg, suffering a broke back. She broke up in a storm on 26 September.

=== 20 September ===
List of shipwrecks: 20 September 1907
Ship	State	Description
Cassie F. Bronson	United States	The 952-ton vessel was wrecked at Conway, South Carolina.
Hiawatha	United States	The excursion steamer sank in shallow water at Port Huron, Michigan.
Josepha Formosa	Spain	The 535-ton vessel was wrecked at San Feliú de Guixols, Catalonia, Spain.
Vera	United States	The 10-gross register ton motor vessel burned on the Queets River in Washington. All four people on board survived.

=== 21 September ===
List of shipwrecks: 21 September 1906
Ship	State	Description
Atlantic	United States	The 221-gross register ton screw steamer sank off Battery Island in the Cape Fear River in North Carolina after colliding with the screw steamer Navahoe (United States). All 24 people on board survived.
Easdale	United Kingdom	The 116-ton vessel was wrecked on Scaurs of Cruden near Aberdeen.

=== 22 September ===
List of shipwrecks: 22 September 1906
Ship	State	Description
Ellida	Sweden	The 117-ton vessel sprung a leak and capsized, drifting ashore at Faggerviken.
Skip	United States	The 16-gross register ton scow was wrecked at Mount Andrew (55°30′N 132°20′W) on the Kasaan Peninsula in Southeast Alaska after the lines mooring her to a wharf parted in a storm and she drifted ashore, where the surf broke her up. The only person on board survived.

=== 24 September ===
List of shipwrecks: 24 September 1906
Ship	State	Description
Linnea	Norway	The 355-ton vessel was wrecked at Cayo Hicacos.

=== 25 September ===
List of shipwrecks: 25 September 1906
Ship	State	Description
Columbian	Canada	The sternwheel paddle steamer was destroyed by an explosion and fire on the Yukon River at Eagle Rock in Canada′s Yukon Territory, killing six members of the 25-man crew.
F. W. Webster, jr.	United States	The 8-gross register ton sternwheel motor paddle vessel burned on the Tennessee River at Decatur, Alabama. The only person on board survived.
Georgian	United Kingdom	The 1,098-ton vessel went aground on Terschelling. Later refloated and sold for scrap.
Harry A. Berwind	United States	The 996-gross register ton schooner was stranded on the Isle of Pines off the coast of Cuba. All nine people on board survived, .
Lila	United States	1906 Mississippi hurricane: The 6-gross register ton sloop sank in Dauphin Island Bay on the coast of Alabama. Both people on board survived.
Marion Grimes	United States	The 72-gross register ton schooner was stranded on Assateague Island, Virginia seven miles (11 km) north of the Life Saving Station, a total loss. All 15 people on board made it to the beach in the vessels boats.
Newell B. Hawes	United States	The schooner sprung a leak at Newburyport, Massachusetts, and was beached.
Olivia	United States	1906 Mississippi hurricane: The 9-gross register ton schooner in Dauphin Island Bay on the coast of Alabama with the loss of all three people on board survived.
Oneida	United States	The 22-gross register ton screw steamer was lost after she collided with the screw steamer Charles B. Hill (United States) in the Detroit River on the Canada-United States border between Michigan and Ontario. All three people on board survived.
S. O. Co. No. 10	United States	The tug was sunk in a collision with the tug Ella (United States) in the East River off Adams Street, Brooklyn. One crewman died later on shore.
S. O. Co. No. 90	United States	1906 Mississippi hurricane: The barge was separated from her tug Astral (United States), during the hurricane 225 miles (362 km) west north west of the Dry Tortugas and was never seen again. Lost with all nine hands.

=== 26 September ===
List of shipwrecks: 26 September 1906
Ship	State	Description
Campbell	Norway	1906 Mississippi hurricane: The sailing bark was sunk at a pier at Pensacola, Florida.
Daisy	United States	1906 Mississippi hurricane: The 33-gross register ton schooner was stranded on Horn Island on the coast of Mississippi with the loss of one life. There were four survivors.
Elmer E. Randall	United States	1906 Mississippi hurricane: The 56-gross register ton schooner sank in the Gulf of Mexico 75 nautical miles (139 km; 86 mi) off Mobile, Alabama. All eight people on board survived.
Fort Morgan	United States	1906 Mississippi hurricane: The steamer was driven ashore at the foot of St. Frances Street, Mobile, Alabama.
Fred P. Litchfield	United States	1906 Mississippi hurricane: The 1,045-gross register ton schooner barge or scow barge sank in the Gulf of Mexico at 26°00′N 87°50′W. All eight people on board survived.
Gamma	United States	1906 Mississippi hurricane:With no one on board, the 89-gross register ton sternwheel paddle steamer sank off Mobile, Alabama.
Governor Stone	United States	1906 Mississippi hurricane: The sailing vessel capsized in Herron Bay on the coast of Alabama and was driven 300 yards (270 m) into a marsh. Her owner was her sole survivor. She was refloated, repaired, and returned to service.
Hastings	United Kingdom	The 916-ton barge burned in the Irrawaddy River near Prome, British Burma.
Hercules	Norway	1906 Mississippi hurricane: The sailing bark lumber ship was wrecked on Ship Island just north of Fort Massachusetts and was declared a total loss.
Jennie Hulbert	United States	1906 Mississippi hurricane: The 440-gross register ton brig was abandoned in the Gulf of Mexico. All eight people on board survived. She remained afloat and was towed in to Port Eads, Louisiana, on 10 October.
Navarre	France	The 304-ton fishing vessel was wrecked on Basses de St. Marie Rocks, St. Pierre and Miquelon.
S. O. Co. No. 90	United States	1906 Mississippi hurricane: The 2,019-gross register ton schooner barge or scow barge sank in the Gulf of Mexico off the Dry Tortugas with the loss of all nine people on board.
Unidentified schooners	United States	1906 Mississippi hurricane: A small fleet of several sailing schooners sank at Heron Bay, Alabama, with the loss of all hands.

=== 27 September ===
List of shipwrecks: 27 September 1906
Ship	State	Description
A. J. Chapman	United States	With no one on board, the 48-gross register ton schooner was stranded at Wrights Mill Beach on the coast of Florida.
Agnes	United States	1906 Mississippi hurricane: The 14-gross register ton schooner was stranded at Bayou La Batre, Alabama, with the loss of all three people on board.
Agnes	United States	1906 Mississippi hurricane: With no one aboard, the 8-gross register ton schooner was stranded at Dauphin Island, Alabama.
Altama	United States	1906 Mississippi hurricane: The 31-gross register ton schooner was stranded in Pensacola Bay, Florida. All six people on board survived.
Amelia	United States	1906 Mississippi hurricane: The steamer was sunk at Mobile, Alabama.
Angelo	United States	1906 Mississippi hurricane: After the 122-gross register ton sidewheel paddle steamer's dock at Pensacola, Florida, was blown away, she was stranded on the beach in Pensacola Bay and broke up. All six people on board survived.
Antonietta	Italy	The brigantine foundered at Alicante, Spain.
Athena	Unknown British Colony	1906 Mississippi hurricane: The 663-ton vessel was wrecked at Mobile.
Aurore	Portugal	The 194-ton vessel was wrecked on the bar of the Limpopo River.
Baunen	Norway	1906 Mississippi hurricane: The 833-ton vessel was wrecked on Horn Island, Mississippi.
B. F. Sutter	United States	1906 Mississippi hurricane: The 36-gross register ton schooner was stranded in Pensacola Bay, Florida. All seven people on board survived.
Campbell	Norway	1906 Mississippi hurricane: The 1,099-ton vessel was wrecked at Pensacola.
Capt. Fritz	United States	1906 Mississippi hurricane: The packet ship was driven ashore at Pensacola, Florida. Refloated and repaired.
Carrie N. Chase	United States	The 48-gross register ton schooner was stranded at Fisherville, Florida. All seven people on board survived.
City of Concord	United States	The 385-gross register ton screw steamer sank in Lake Erie off Pelee Island, Ontario, with the loss of two lives. There were ten survivors.
Clara R. Grimes	United States	1906 Mississippi hurricane: The 34-gross register ton schooner was stranded in Pensacola Bay, Florida. All eight people on board survived.
D. W.	United States	1906 Mississippi hurricane: With no one on board, the 5-gross register ton sloop was stranded in Pensacola Bay, Florida.
Ethel	United States	1906 Mississippi hurricane: The 7-gross register ton schooner sank at Heron Bay, Alabama, with the loss of one life. There were two survivors.
Emma	Norway	1906 Mississippi hurricane: The lumber barque sank off Mobile, Alabama, after the hurricane passed over the city.
Fluorine	United States	1906 Mississippi hurricane: The 386-gross register ton bark was stranded on Cat Island on the coast of Mississippi. All nine people on board survived.
Francis and Margery	United States	1906 Mississippi hurricane: The 40-gross register ton schooner was stranded at Pensacola, Florida. All six people on board survived.
Gertrude A. Bartlett	United States	The 374-gross register ton schooner was abandoned in the North Atlantic Ocean at 29°15′N 71°45′W. All seven people on board survived.
Gracie S	United States	1906 Mississippi hurricane: The 9-gross register ton schooner was stranded in Pensacola Bay on the coast of Florida. All five people on board survived.
Gussie	United States	1906 Mississippi hurricane: The 998-gross register ton steel-hulled sidewheel paddle steamer was stranded on Dauphin Island , Alabama. All 33 people on board survived.
Hattie B. Moore	United States	1906 Mississippi hurricane: The steamer was wrecked at Mobile, Alabama. She was a Total Loss.
Helen	United States	1906 Mississippi hurricane: The 20-gross register ton screw steamer's dock at Pensacola, Florida, was blown away, setting her adrift, and she broke up on the beach. All five people on board survived.
Hercules	Norway	1906 Mississippi hurricane: The 1,199-ton vessel was wrecked at Ship Island, Mississippi.
Hilary	United States	1906 Mississippi hurricane: The 38-gross register ton schooner was stranded at Perdido Key, Florida. Both people on board survived.
Irma	United States	1906 Mississippi hurricane: With no one on board, the 6-gross register ton schooner was stranded in Pensacola Bay on the coast of Florida.
J. P. Schuh	United States	1906 Mississippi hurricane: The laid up steamer was driven ashore at Mobile, Alabama.
J. Wago	United States	1906 Mississippi hurricane: The 19-gross register ton schooner was stranded at Biloxi, Mississippi. All four people on board survived.
Jas. P. Collins	United States	1906 Mississippi hurricane: The 13-gross register ton schooner was stranded in Pensacola Bay, Florida. All four people on board survived.
Jos. Favre-Baldwin	United States	1906 Mississippi hurricane: The 50-gross register ton screw steamer burned at Fairport, Mississippi. All three people on board survived.
Josephine	United States	1906 Mississippi hurricane: With no one on board, the 774-gross register ton screw steamer was lost when she collided with the barge Black Diamond (United States) at Mobile, Alabama.
Josie Johnson	United States	1906 Mississippi hurricane: The 27-gross register ton schooner was stranded in Pensacola Bay, Florida. All six people on board survived.
Kauikeaouli	United States	The 140-gross register ton schooner was abandoned in the Pacific Ocean off Hawaii. All seven people on board survived.
Lady Grace	United States	1906 Mississippi hurricane: With no one on board, the 144-gross register ton sternwheel paddle steamer was wrecked at Mobile, Alabama.
Lila	United States	1906 Mississippi hurricane: The sloop was lost in Dauphin Island Bay (30.2650°N 88.1059°W) on the United States Gulf Coast in Alabama.
Margaret S	United States	1906 Mississippi hurricane: With no one on board, the 11-gross register ton schooner was stranded on Cat Island, Mississippi.
Margrette B	United States	1906 Mississippi hurricane: The 13-gross register ton schooner was stranded at Point of Pines, Alabama, with the loss of both people on board.
Marie	Germany	1906 Mississippi hurricane: The 1,022-ton vessel was wrecked at Pensacola.
Mary	United States	1906 Mississippi hurricane: With no one on board, the laid-up 198-gross register ton sternwheel paddle steamer — a packet ship — was blown from her moorings on the east side of the Mobile River to the city side at Mobile, Alabama, and was wrecked. She was a total loss.
Mary E. Staples	United States	1906 Mississippi hurricane: The steamer was wrecked at Mobile, Alabama. She was later raised and repaired.
Mary Gray	United States	1906 Mississippi hurricane: The 8-gross register ton schooner sank in Dauphin Island Bay (30.2650°N 88.1059°W) Alabama. All four people on board survived.
Mary S. Bleese	United States	1906 Mississippi hurricane: The steamer was wrecked at Mobile, Alabama. She was later raised and repaired.
Mary Wittich	United States	1906 Mississippi hurricane: The steamer's dock was blown away in lower Mobile Bay and she driven up on the beach. Refloated and repaired.
Merzapore	Norway	1906 Mississippi hurricane: The 1,144-ton vessel was stranded at Mobile. Later refloated, taken to Gulfport, Mississippi for conversion into a barge.
Minerva	United States	1906 Mississippi hurricane: The 64-gross register ton schooner sank in Pensacola Bay, Florida. All eight people on board survived.
Nelley Keyser	United States	1906 Mississippi hurricane: The 42-gross register ton screw steamer was blown away from her dock at Pensacola, Florida, and broke up on the beach in Pensacola Bay. All five people on board survived.
Nellie B	United States	1906 Mississippi hurricane: With no one on board, the 6-gross register ton schooner was stranded in Pensacola Bay, Florida.
Norge	Norway	1906 Mississippi hurricane: The 1,580-ton vessel was stranded at Mobile. Later refloated, taken to Gulfport, Mississippi for conversion into a barge.
Old Hickory	United States	1906 Mississippi hurricane: The 29-gross register ton schooner was stranded at Mobile, Alabama. Both people on board survived.
Olivari	Italy	1906 Mississippi hurricane: The 1,008-ton vessel was wrecked at Pensacola.
Olive	United States	1906 Mississippi hurricane: With no one on board, the 172-gross register ton schooner sank in the Mobile River in Alabama.
Olivia	United States	1906 Mississippi hurricane: The schooner was lost in Dauphin Island Bay (30.2650°N 88.1059°W) Alabama.
Phenix	United States	The lighter sank at dock in the East River at One Hundred and Fifty-Sixth Street.
Trojan	Italy	1906 Mississippi hurricane: The 1,624-ton vessel was wrecked at Mobile.
Two Friends	United States	1906 Mississippi hurricane: The 6-gross register ton sloop sank at Heron Bay, Alabama, with the loss of both people on board.
Two Sisters	United States	1906 Mississippi hurricane: The 21-gross register ton schooner was stranded at Bay Point, Alabama. Both people on board survived.
Wm. H. Warren	United States	1906 Mississippi hurricane: The 31-gross register ton schooner sank off St. Joseph Point, Florida with the loss of all seven people on board.

=== 28 September ===
List of shipwrecks: 28 September 1906
Ship	State	Description
Ashbrooke	United Kingdom	The 1,419-ton vessel was sunk in a collision near Brunshausen. Raised and sold for scrap.
Felix	Russia	The 119-ton sailing vessel was abandoned off Windau, Russia.

=== 29 September ===
List of shipwrecks: 29 September 1906
Ship	State	Description
No. 2 (or Car Ferry No. 2)	United States	The 1,548-gross register ton barge — a train ferry — capsized and sank off Chicago, Illinois, in a gale. Her master and two crewmen were killed. There were three survivors: The steam tug Perfection (United States) rescued two of them, and the United States Life-Saving Service rescued the other.
City of Concord	United States	The steamer sprung a leak and foundered in heavy seas on Lake Erie four miles (6.4 km) east of the south end of Kelleys Island. Two or three crewmen went down with the ship after refusing to get in the lifeboat when ordered to.
Loch Etive	United Kingdom	The 104-ton vessel was wrecked near Tarbert.
M. W. Wood	United States	The tow steamer filled and sank when a line to her tow parted causing a severe list in the Mississippi River 35 miles (56 km) south of New Orleans, Louisiana, sinking in 115 feet (35 m) of water.

=== 30 September ===
List of shipwrecks: 30 September 1906
Ship	State	Description
Akashi Maru	Japan	The 1,571-ton vessel was wrecked near Amoy.
Charterhouse	Straits Settlements	The 314-foot (96 m), 2,021-ton cargo ship sank in a typhoon in the Hainan Straits off Hainan Head. The crew were rescued by Kohsichang (Germany).
Lady Bird	United Kingdom	The 219-ton fishing vessel was wrecked 2 miles north of Collieston, Scotland.
Negaunee	United States	The 640-gross register ton schooner was stranded in Lake Erie. All seven people on board survived.
Oshkosh	United States	The 16-gross register ton motor yacht burned at Oshkosh, Wisconsin. All seven people on board survived.

=== Unknown date ===
List of shipwrecks: unknown September 1907
Ship	State	Description
Asa T. Stowell	United States	The 419-gross register ton schooner departed Pensacola, Florida on 22 September, bound for Havana, Cuba, with seven people on board and was never heard from again. Probable victim of the 1906 Mississippi hurricane.
Exception	Unknown British colony	The 380-ton vessel sailed from Pascagoula, Mississippi for Havana, Cuba on 16 September and vanished. Possible victim of the 1906 Mississippi hurricane
Isabella Gill	United States	The 525-ton vessel sailed from New York for Mayport on 11 September and vanished.
Launberga	Norway	The 1,215-ton vessel was stranded on Frying Pan Shoals sometime before 24 September. Refloated, towed to Southport and sold.
Milton	Unknown British colony	The 348-ton vessel sailed from Cienfuegos, Cuba for Mobile, Alabama on 18 September and vanished. Probable victim of the 1906 Mississippi hurricane.
Pharos	United Kingdom	The trawler disappeared after leaving Grimsby for the Faeroe Isles fishing grounds. Lost with all hands.

== October ==
=== 1 October ===
List of shipwrecks: 1 October 1906
Ship	State	Description
Rio Lima	Portugal	The 103-ton vessel was wrecked at Terceira, The Azores.

=== 2 October ===
List of shipwrecks: 2 October 1906
Ship	State	Description
Pelican	United States	The 13-gross register ton schooner was stranded at Pass-a-Grille on the west coast of Florida. Both people on board survived.
Santa Ana	United States	The steamer sprung a leak in a severe gale 50 miles (80 km) off Cape Flattery. She was beached in Callam Bay. After removing some cargo she was refloated and taken to Seattle, Washington, for repairs.

=== 3 October ===
List of shipwrecks: 3 October 1906
Ship	State	Description
Maunie	United States	During a severe windstorm, the 36-gross register ton sternwheel paddle steamer either was stranded or foundered while tied up at a dock in the Ohio River at Eckel's Landing near Grand Chain, Illinois. All four people on board survived, but she was declared a total loss.
Principessa Mafalda	Italy	The 2,391-ton sailing vessel was dismasted and abandoned 50 miles (80 km) off Cape Espiritu Santo, Samar, the Philippines.
W. R. Huntley	Unknown British colony	The 167-ton vessel was wrecked at Wabana, Newfoundland.

=== 4 October ===
List of shipwrecks: 4 October 1906
Ship	State	Description
HMS Landrail	Royal Navy	The decommissioned Curlew-class torpedo gun vessel was sunk as a target.

=== 5 October ===
List of shipwrecks: 5 October 1906
Ship	State	Description
Camphill	United Kingdom	The 226-foot (69 m), 1,240-ton barque was wrecked on Point Tumbes, Chile.
Shasta	United States	The 722-gross register ton screw steamer ran aground in dense fog and was wrecked off Point Conception on the coast of California with the loss of one life. There were 15 survivors.

=== 6 October ===
List of shipwrecks: 6 October 1906
Ship	State	Description
Ada Medora	United States	The 290-gross register ton schooner was stranded one mile (1.6 km) off Buffalo, New York, a total loss. Half her cargo was salvaged. All seven people on board survived.
Edward Wright	United States	The 23-gross register ton schooner capsized in the Chesapeake Bay off Thomas Point on the coast of Maryland with the loss of both people on board.
Gracie A	United States	With no one on board, the 7-gross register ton sloop was stranded on Squirrel Island off Boothbay Harbor, Maine.
Manningtry	United Kingdom	The 2,845-ton vessel was abandoned at sea 109 miles (175 km) west of Fayal, the Azores.

=== 7 October ===
List of shipwrecks: 7 October 1906
Ship	State	Description
Bessie Parker	Canada	The schooner was wrecked in heavy seas and high winds one mile (1.6 km) south west of the Quoddy Head Life Saving Station, a total loss. Her six crewmen survived.
Keewaydin	Canada	The schooner dragged anchor in a gale and went ashore six miles (9.7 km) west of the Rocky Point, New York Life Saving Station. Crew rescued by the United States Life Saving Service.
May Richards	United States	The 530-gross register ton schooner was stranded on Ohio's North Bass Island in Lake Erie. All six people on board survived.

=== 8 October ===
List of shipwrecks: 8 October 1906
Ship	State	Description
Abram Smith	United States	The 372-gross register ton schooner was stranded on Duck Island in Lake Huron. All seven people on board survived.
Allegro	Norway	The 173.3-foot (52.8 m), 935-ton barque sprang a leak and was abandoned in the North Atlantic (50°08′N 11°00′W). The crew were rescued by the trawler Gevalia (United Kingdom).
Hoo Hoo	United States	The 82-gross register ton sternwheel paddle steamer burned either in the Mississippi River at New Orleans, Louisiana, or in Vermilion Bay on the coast of Louisiana, according to different sources. All six people on board survived, but she was declared a total loss.
J. B. Comstock	United States	The 325-gross register ton schooner was stranded in the Duck Islands in Lake Huron. All seven people on board survived.
Lotus	United States	The 148-gross register ton sand barge, under tow by the steamer Winfield S. Cahill (United States), sprang a leak and sank near Egg Island off Cohansey Point on the coast of New Jersey. Winfield S. Cahill rescued her crew.
Onward	United States	The steamer broke loose from her moorings in high winds at Northport, Michigan. The winds blew her ashore where she broke up, a total loss.
Pasadena	United States	The 2,076-gross register ton schooner barge or scow barge was stranded on the Portage Canal Breakwater in Michigan with the loss of two lives. There were eight survivors.
Port Stephens	United Kingdom	The 3,554-ton vessel was abandoned at sea 150 miles (240 km) south of New Zealand (49°21′S 164°48′E) after breaking her propeller shaft and was drifting to the south rapidly. Her crew was taken off by the barque Ravenscourt (United Kingdom).

=== 9 October ===
List of shipwrecks: 9 October 1906
Ship	State	Description
E. A. Post	Unknown British colony	The 199-ton vessel was wrecked off Costa Rica.
Samuel H. Foster	United States	The 672-gross register ton schooner barge or scow barge was stranded ion the Portage Canal in Michigan. All seven people on board survived.
Skulda	United Kingdom	The 1,177-ton vessel was sunk in a collision with Trento (Norway) in the Firth of Forth.
W. H. Pringle	United States	The 575-gross register ton sternwheel paddle steamer was wrecked after hitting a rock in the Entiat Rapids in the Columbia River off Entiat, Washington, a total loss. All 17 people aboard survived.
Vasconia	France	The 3,084-ton vessel caught fire at Madeira and was sunk to extinguish the fire. Refloated and taken to Marseille.
Wayne	United States	The 708-gross register ton schooner barge or scow barge was stranded 14 nautical miles (26 km; 16 mi) southwest of the Portage Canal in Michigan. All seven people on board survived.

=== 10 October ===
List of shipwrecks: 10 October 1906
Ship	State	Description
John R. Rees	United States	The 81-gross register ton schooner sank off Dymers Wharves, Virginia. All four people on board survived.
Roy	United States	The steamer sank at dock in the Black River while under repair at Poplar Bluff, Missouri. She was scheduled to be raised later.
Sparta	United States	With no one on board, the 6-gross register ton schooner sank in Papys Bayou in Florida. Both people on board survived.

=== 11 October ===
List of shipwrecks: 11 October 1906
Ship	State	Description
Black Diamond	United States	With no one on board, the 121-gross register ton barge was lost when she collided with the screw steamer Josephine (United States) off Mobile, Alabama.
Ella Powell	United States	The 140-gross register ton schooner sank off New London, Connecticut, with the loss of one life. There was one survivor.
Georges Rene	France	The 140-ton vessel sank in the Atlantic Ocean.
Helen B. Crosby	United States	Carrying a cargo of coal, the 227-foot (69 m), 1,776-gross register ton four-masted schooner was stranded on Inner Bay Ledge, a reef in Penobscot Bay 3 nautical miles (5.6 km; 3.5 mi) east of Owls Head, Maine. She broke up and sank at 44°04.403′N 068°57.164′W, a total loss. All 11 people on board survived.
Joseph Baker	United States	The tow steamer was entering "The Narrows" of the Saco River in New England when she was pushed ashore, causing damage that resulted in beaching and partial sinking.
Saint Mungo	United Kingdom	The 1,852-ton ship caught fire and was abandoned in sinking condition in the Atlantic Ocean off Brazil (24°00′S 44°00′W). The crew was rescued.

=== 12 October ===
List of shipwrecks: 12 October 1906
Ship	State	Description
Argonaut	United States	While no one was on board, the 1,118-gross register ton screw steamer burned to the water's edge at Marysville, Michigan.
Dolphin	United States	The 5-gross register ton sloop-rigged yacht was lost when she struck a dock at Milwaukee, Wisconsin. The only person on board survived.
Eidsiva	Norway	The 155.8-foot (47.5 m), 579-ton barque was wrecked at Hesnesskjærene, at Valøyene, off Grimstad, Norway.
Hattie Wells	United States	The 376-gross register ton schooner burned at Marysville, Michigan. All three people on board survived.
Southern Queen	Unknown	1906 Florida Keys hurricane: The schooner was wrecked at Roatan, Nicaragua and went to pieces in a storm.

=== 13 October ===
List of shipwrecks: 13 October 1906
Ship	State	Description
Koh-i-Noor	United Kingdom	The 215-ton vessel was wrecked on Bonaire.
Marie Becker	Sweden	The 487-ton vessel was stranded at Clee Ness Sands. Refloated, taken to Hull, England and broken up.
Merom	United States	The 925-gross register ton schooner was stranded on Bonaire in the Netherlands West Indies. All nine people on board survived.
Oranje Nassau	Netherlands	The 1,308-ton cargo vessel was wrecked 3 miles (4.8 km) east of Willemstad, Curacao in a severe gale.
Vivax	Norway	The 1,888-ton vessel was wrecked at Cape Ray, Newfoundland.

=== 14 October ===
List of shipwrecks: 14 October 1906
Ship	State	Description
Adel	Sweden	The 596-ton vessel was wrecked outside Sideby, south of Christinestad.
Boone No. 4	United States	The ferry struck a picket, holing her hull, and sank at Point Pleasant, West Virginia, in the Ohio River.
Wanderer	United States	The steamer sprang a leak and sank in Jew Fish Creek near Miami, Florida, in six feet (1.8 m) of water. Later raised.

=== 15 October ===
List of shipwrecks: 15 October 1906
Ship	State	Description
Lina	Norway	The 96.8-foot (29.5 m), 268-ton brig was wrecked at Store Sletter, Kristianiafjorden, or near Moss, Norway.
Moccasin	United States	The 15-gross register ton schooner sank at Knights Key in the Florida Keys. The only person on board survived.

=== 16 October ===
List of shipwrecks: 16 October 1906
Ship	State	Description
Bissau	Portugal	The 2,459-ton cargo ship vessel was wrecked at Cay Sal.
Ivanhoe	Norway	The 458-ton cargo ship vessel was wrecked at Whitton Sands, Humber.
Lutin	French Navy	The Farfadet-class submarine accidentally sank. Raised, repaired and returned to service.

=== 17 October ===
List of shipwrecks: 17 October 1906
Ship	State	Description
Hanne	Denmark	The 125-ton vessel was wrecked off Nicolaistad.
Nirvana	United States	The 53-gross register ton schooner was stranded on the Isle of Pines off Cuba. All seven people on board survived.
Star of Peace	United Kingdom (South Africa)	The 211-ton fishing vessel was wrecked on Quion Point off Cape Town, South Africa.

=== 18 October ===
List of shipwrecks: 18 October 1906
Ship	State	Description
Henry Sutton	United States	The 602-gross register ton schooner departed Chéverie, Nova Scotia, with seven people on board and was never heard from again.
Houseboat No. 4	United States	1906 Florida Keys hurricane: The accommodations barge broke loose from her moorings, she broke up and sank in Hawke's Channel near Longboat Key, Florida. Of approximately 175 men aboard 72 were rescued by Jenny (Austria-Hungary), the rest were lost.
Palm	United States	1906 Florida Keys hurricane: The 12-gross register ton motor vessel was stranded on Long Key in the Florida Keys. Both people on board survived.
Race	United States	1906 Florida Keys hurricane: The 28-gross register ton schooner was stranded on Knights Key in the central Florida Keys. All five people on board survived.
Sidney	United States	1906 Florida Keys hurricane: The 7-gross register ton schooner sank off Metacumbie, Florida. All three people on board survived.
Silver Heel	United States	1906 Florida Keys hurricane: The 10-gross register ton schooner was stranded at Miami, Florida. All seven people on board survived.
St. Lucie	United States	St. Lucie 1906 Florida Keys hurricane: The 165-gross register ton iron-hulled passenger sternwheel paddle steamer was wrecked off Elliott Key in the Florida Keys with the loss of 21 lives. There were 76 survivors. She was a total loss.
Sunbeam	United States	The 7-gross register ton schooner sank at Cutler, Florida. Both people on board survived.
Thistle	United States	1906 Florida Keys hurricane: The 10-gross register ton motor vessel was stranded on Key Largo in the Florida Keys. Both people on board survived.
Two Brothers	United States	1906 Florida Keys hurricane: The 12-gross register ton schooner was stranded on Elliott Key in the Florida Keys. All three people on board survived.

=== 19 October ===
List of shipwrecks: 19 October 1906
Ship	State	Description
A. A. Rowe	United States	The 45-gross register ton schooner was stranded on Egmont Key at the mouth of Tampa Bay on the coast of Florida. All five people on board survived.
Duchesse de Berry	France	The 2,158-ton full rigged ship was wrecked in the Bay of Saint John, Chile, between Ile des États and Cape Horn.
Wm. J. Blankfard	United States	The steamer capsized and sank at the Drawbridge Wharf in the harbor of Baltimore.

=== 20 October ===
List of shipwrecks: 20 October 1906
Ship	State	Description
Anchovy	United States	With no one on board, the 11-gross register ton scow was stranded on Mayne Island in the southern Gulf Islands in British Columbia, Canada.
George Farwell	United States	The 977-gross register ton steam barge was wrecked in thick fog on Cape Henry on the coast of Virginia one mile (1.6 km) south of the Cape Henry Lighthouse. The United States Life-Saving Service rescued her entire crew of 15 and some of her cargo was salvaged, but she was declared a total loss.
Lebanon	United Kingdom	The 565-ton vessel foundered 13 miles (21 km) off Cape Mayor.

=== 21 October ===
List of shipwrecks: 21 October 1906
Ship	State	Description
Archimedes	United Kingdom	The 199-ton vessel was wrecked in Cambois Bay, Blyth. Refloated and sold for scrap.
Sesnon No. 5	United States	While anchored off Nome, District of Alaska, the 27-gross register ton barge broke loose from her moorings during a gale and was stranded on the beach 6 nautical miles (11 km; 6.9 mi) west of Nome. The only person on board survived. On 4 January 1907, she was completely demolished when crushed by ice during a storm that struck while she still was stranded.
Sesnon No. 9	United States	While anchored off Nome, District of Alaska, with no cargo aboard, the 18-gross register ton barge broke loose from her moorings during a gale and was stranded on a beach 6 nautical miles (11 km; 6.9 mi) west of Nome. The only person on board survived. On 4 January 1907, she was completely demolished when crushed by ice during a storm that struck while she still was stranded.

=== 22 October ===
List of shipwrecks: 22 October 1906
Ship	State	Description
Abbotsford	United Kingdom	The 1,058-ton vessel was sunk in a collision off Sunderland, England.
Corona	United States	The steamer burned to the waters edge at Duluth, Minnesota.
H. M. Carter	United States	The steamer sank at Marksville, Louisiana. Raised and repaired.

=== 23 October ===
List of shipwrecks: 23 October 1906
Ship	State	Description
Cumberland	United States	The steamer struck the Ohio Street Bridge in Buffalo, New York, and sank.
Frank Butler	United States	The 74-gross register ton schooner was stranded in the Chesapeake Bay at Windmill Point on the coast of Virginia. All three people on board survived.
Haversham Grange	United Kingdom	The 7,550-ton vessel caught fire 675 to 800 miles (1,086 to 1,287 km) (depending on source) northwest of Cape Town, South Africa. Her crew was taken off by Matatua. She was still burning the next morning when hope of extinguishing the fire ended.

=== 24 October ===
List of shipwrecks: 24 October 1906
Ship	State	Description
Cromartyshire	United Kingdom	The 248.8-foot (75.8 m), 1,554-ton sailing ship was wrecked at Tetos Point, Printabu Island, Antofagasta.
Grand View	United States	The steamer was wrecked after dragging anchor and going ashore on Little Calumet Island. Her boiler and machinery was salvaged.
Hastings	United States	The 165-gross register ton screw steamer burned and sank off Long Neck Point or Shippan Point in Stamford, Connecticut (sources disagree) due to lamps overturning in a collision with an unidentified schooner. All 11 people on board were rescued by Middletown.
Lewis H. Giles	United States	The 135-gross register ton schooner was stranded on Wood Island, Newfoundland. All ten people on board survived.
Venture	United States	The motor launch filled and sank at dock in a gale with high seas near the Sturgeon Point Light. Her cargo, machinery, and propeller were salvaged, and then she was abandoned.

=== 25 October ===
List of shipwrecks: 25 October 1906
Ship	State	Description
Collins Howes, jr.	United States	The 33-gross register ton schooner was stranded on Saddle Island in Penobscot Bay on the coast of Maine. Both people on board survived.
Glenullen	United States	The 73-gross register ton schooner was stranded in Machias Bay on the coast of Maine. Both people on board survived.
Native	United States	The 34-gross register ton sternwheel paddle steamer sank in the Ouachita River at Camden, Arkansas. All seven people on board survived.
Peter Iredale	United Kingdom	Peter Iredale, 1906 The barque was wrecked in rainy weather at Clatsop Spit, Oregon. Crew rescued by the United States Life Saving Service.
Scagit (or Skagit)	United States	The 506-gross register ton barkentine was wrecked in fog on Vancouver Island near Clo-oose, British Columbia. Her master and the cook died, but the other eight people on board survived. She was a total loss.
Teutonic	United Kingdom	The 152-ton fishing vessel foundered in the North Sea.

=== 26 October ===
List of shipwrecks: 26 October 1906
Ship	State	Description
Isaac Pereire	France	The steamer was wrecked in dense fog off Minorca or Puerto Mahon, Balearic Islands.
Plow Boy	United States	The 16-gross register ton schooner was stranded in northern Lake Michigan off Waugoshance Light on the coast of Michigan. Both people on board survived.
Sehome	United States	The 11-gross register ton, 38.2-foot (11.6 m) schooner was wrecked with the loss of her entire crew of three at Point Gardner (57°01′N 134°37′W) on Admiralty Island in the Alexander Archipelago in Southeast Alaska.

=== 27 October ===
List of shipwrecks: 27 October 1906
Ship	State	Description
Lackawanna	United States	The package freighter struck the submerged breakwater extension at the entrance to the harbor of Cleveland, Ohio, holing her hull. The wind and seas worked her over the submerged extension and she sank east of the entrance. Though reported a total loss she was raised 28 November and repaired and returned to service. Her crew was rescued by the United States Life Saving Service.
Onni	Russia	The 402-ton vessel was sunk in a collision between Trelleborg and Falsterbo, Sweden.
Swan	Australia	The ketch was sunk in a collision with Queenscliff (flag unknown) off Cape Schank.

=== 28 October ===
List of shipwrecks: 28 October 1906
Ship	State	Description
Baron Huntly	United Kingdom	The 1,398-ton vessel foundered off Cabo Raso, Portugal.
Charley Curlin	United States	The 92-gross register ton sternwheel paddle steamer burned while tied up at a dock on the Mississippi River at Caruthersville, Missouri. All ten people on board survived, but she was declared a total loss.
Elgin	United States	The 330-gross register ton barge was abandoned in Lake Superior off Grand Marais, Minnesota. Both people on board survived.
Hermann	Germany	The 2,243-ton cargo ship was sunk in a collision with Peter Rickmers (Germany) in fog near the East Goodwin Lightvessel. Twenty crew died and four rescued.
Johnny	Sweden	The 324-ton vessel was wrecked at Aeskeskar, south of Slado.
LB+	United States	The 13-gross register ton motor paddle vessel burned on the Missouri River at Leavenworth, Kansas. All three people on board survived.
Norna	United States	The 23-gross register ton schooner sank off Lake Worth, Florida. Both people on board survived.
Pathfinder	United States	The steamer ran aground in a gale and high seas in Lake Huron 9 nautical miles (17 km; 10 mi) from the Harbor Beach, Michigan, Life-Saving Station. Her master scuttled her to prevent further damage and then her crew abandoned ship. The United States Life-Saving Service rescued her entire crew. She later was pumped out, refloated, and pulled off by tugs on 2 November.
Skjalm Hvide	Denmark	The 603-ton cargo vessel was wrecked at Vorupor, near Thisted, Denmark.

=== 29 October ===
List of shipwrecks: 29 October 1906
Ship	State	Description
Elixir	United Kingdom	The 2,746-ton vessel was wrecked on Cape Ballard.
Planet	Norway	The 291-ton schooner was lost in the North Sea.
Pluggen	Norway	The 190-ton vessel was wrecked at Aasefluen, between Raunen and Lodshaven.
Serbury	United Kingdom	The 3,873-ton vessel was wrecked at Homborsund, Norway near Christiansand while under tow and her towline broke.

=== 30 October ===
List of shipwrecks: 30 October 1906
Ship	State	Description
Charterhouse	United Kingdom	The steamer foundered off Hainan Head, Hainan Island with a loss of over 60 lives. 24 crewmen and 2 women were rescued from a raft after 43 hours by Kohsychang (Germany).
Checotah	United States	The 658-gross register ton schooner barge or scow barge sank in Lake Huron off Harbor Beach, Michigan. All seven people on board survived.
Grand View	Canada	The 17-gross register ton screw steamer was wrecked after breaking her moorings and going ashore on Governor's Island or Little Calumet Island (sources disagree) in the St. Lawrence River opposite Clayton, New York. All three people on board survived.
Vera Cruz 6	Portugal	The 115-ton sailing vessel was lost in the Atlantic Ocean.

=== 31 October ===
List of shipwrecks: 31 October 1906
Ship	State	Description
Elizabeth	United States	The schooner parted her anchor chain in a gale and high seas in the area of the Rocky Point, New York Life Saving Station. She drifted ashore 2 miles (3.2 km) east of the station and sank. Her crew was rescued by the United States Life Saving Service.
Nemea	United Kingdom	The 3,461-ton vessel was abandoned at sea in the North Atlantic.
Silver Star	United States	The 35-gross register ton schooner sank in the York River in Virginia. All three people on board survived.

=== Unknown date ===
List of shipwrecks: Unknown date October 1906
Ship	State	Description
Henry Sutton	United States	The 530-ton vessel departed from Cheverie, Nova Scotia 31 October and vanished.
Emma S	United States	The 50-gross register ton schooner sank off Charleston, South Carolina, with the loss of all four people on board.

== November ==
=== 1 November ===
List of shipwrecks: 1 November 1906
Ship	State	Description
Grace Deering	United States	The 627-gross register ton barge sank in the Atlantic Ocean off Miami, Florida. All six people on board survived.

=== 2 November ===
List of shipwrecks: 2 November 1906
Ship	State	Description
Adeona	Norway	November gale of 1906:The 153.4-foot (46.8 m), 655-ton barque dragged anchor in a gale and was wrecked at Richibucto, New Brunswick, Canada. All 12 crew lost.
Turret Bell	United Kingdom	November gale of 1906: The 237-foot (72 m), 2,21-ton whaleback cargo ship went ashore on Cable Head near St. Peter's Lake, Prince Edward Island, in the Gulf of St. Lawrence, Canada. In 1908 she was towed off the beach and resunk for the Winter. Salvaged in the mid 1909, repaired and returned to service

=== 3 November ===
List of shipwrecks: 3 November 1906
Ship	State	Description
Harlingen	United Kingdom	The 3,471-ton vessel was wrecked in fog 1 1/2 miles (2.4 km) northwest of Cabo Frio, Brazil.
Orpheus	unknown	November gale of 1906:The 78-ton schooner was wrecked at Priest Pond, Prince Edward Island, or Campbell's Cove. All 5 crew rescued.
Sverre	Norway	The 567-ton vessel ran aground on the southwest reef at West Caicos. She was refloated, taken to Turks Island and condemned.

=== 4 November ===
List of shipwrecks: 4 November 1906
Ship	State	Description
G. M. Cochrane	United Kingdom	The schooner ran aground three miles (4.8 km) south of the Nauset, Massachusetts Life Saving Station in high winds and surf. Her crew was rescued by the United States Life Saving Service.
Ida	United States	The 11-gross register ton sternwheel paddle steamer sank. All five people on board survived.
White Wings	Canada	The 142.1-foot (43.3 m), 430-ton barquentine was dismasted and swamped in the North Atlantic on 4 November in a gale. Her crew was taken off 48 hours later (40°50′N 66°46′W) by Mannheim (Germany).

=== 5 November ===
List of shipwrecks: 5 November 1906
Ship	State	Description
Concordia	Sweden	The 423-ton vessel foundered in the North Sea.
Eldora	United States	The 52-gross register ton schooner sank 52 nautical miles (96 km; 60 mi) north-northwest of the Cultivator Shoals off the coast of Maine. Both people on board survived.
Fiora Dilloway	Unknown British colony	The 106-ton vessel was wrecked at Georgetown, Grand Cayman.
Kielseng	Germany	The 1,589-ton cargo vessel was wrecked on Filsand.
Marion C.	Canada	The 457-ton barquentine foundered at (42°18′N 67°20′W) in the North Atlantic east of Boston.
Olga	Norway	November gale of 1906:The 1,080-ton barque was wrecked on Carew's reef Priest Pond, Prince Edward Island and broke in two 1 1/2 miles from the "Orpheas" wreck site. Seven crew died.
Tellus	Sweden	The 227-ton cargo ship vessel was wrecked off Refsnaes Pullen.

=== 6 November ===
List of shipwrecks: 6 November 1906
Ship	State	Description
Crown	United Kingdom	The 129.9-foot (39.6 m), 266-ton steam trawler was wrecked on the Isle of Man, one mile (1.6 km) southwest of Maughold Head.
Sovento	Norway	November gale of 1906:The 1,600-ton barque was wrecked at Tullock Point, Prince Edward Island about 4 miles from "Orpheus" wreck site. Nine crew died. Her Captain and 4 crew survived.

=== 7 November ===
List of shipwrecks: 7 November 1906
Ship	State	Description
Island	Norway	The 154-ton vessel was wrecked on The Goodwins.
Mopang	United States	The 77-gross register ton schooner was stranded at Gay Head, Massachusetts, a total loss. She was stripped by the Underwriters. All three people on board were rescued by the United States Life Saving Service.

=== 8 November ===
List of shipwrecks: 8 November 1906
Ship	State	Description
Hilda Horn	Germany	The 1,412-ton cargo vessel was wrecked near Norderney, East Frisian Islands, Germany, declared a Total Loss. Salvaged, sold, repaired and returned to service as "Franziska Fischer".
Nan M. Dantzler	United States	The 224-gross register ton schooner was abandoned with the loss of one life in the Bay of Campeche off Coatzacoalcos, Mexico. There were five survivors.

=== 9 November ===
List of shipwrecks: 9 November 1906
Ship	State	Description
Urda	Norway	The 118-ton vessel was wrecked near Withernsea, England.

=== 10 November ===
List of shipwrecks: 10 November 1906
Ship	State	Description
Fridthjov Nansen	Norway	The 2,563-ton whaling factory ship vessel hit an uncharted reef, broke into three pieces and sank off the Barff Peninsula, South Georgia Island. Nine crew died, 49 were rescued by the accompanying whalers.

=== 11 November ===
List of shipwrecks: 11 November 1906
Ship	State	Description
Don Quixote	Norway	The 178.7-foot (54.5 m), 1,172-ton barque was wrecked in a north-west gale in an anchorage north of Hälsingborg, Sweden. Refloated and sold for scrap.
Jon Sjodin	Sweden	The 284-ton vessel was wrecked north of Dano, Alund.
Lennätin	Russia	The 705-ton sailing vessel was lost in the Baltic Sea.
Margarethe	Norway	The 574-ton vessel was sunk in a collision off Sweden.
Oscar G.	United States	The steamer burned in Lacasine Bayou, a tributary of the Mermenton River.
Rojeneeks	Russian Empire	The 123-ton vessel was wrecked between Rantan and Neukuhren, Germany.

=== 12 November ===
List of shipwrecks: 12 November 1906
Ship	State	Description
Arrow	United States	The tug sank in a collision with Pequot (United States) off Pier 20 in the East River.
Feodor	Russian Empire	The 378-ton vessel was wrecked at Faludden.
Uwajima Maru No. 7	Japan	The 436-ton vessel burned on the east coast of Moriye.

=== 13 November ===
List of shipwrecks: 13 November 1906
Ship	State	Description
Choho Maru	Japan	The 124-ton vessel was beached on fire near the Esaki Lighthouse, Awaji Island, Japan.
Galena	United Kingdom	Galena The barquentine was wrecked in fog, rain, wind, and high seas at the mouth of the Columbia River. Her crew made it to shore in the ship's boats.
Heian Maru No. 2	Japan	The 457-ton cargo vessel was wrecked in Kerama Bay.
M. P. Grace	United States	The 1,934-gross register ton schooner barge or scow barge was stranded at Shinnecock, New York after losing her tow line to Edward Luckenbach (United States) on 12 November. Vessel and cargo a total loss. All four people on board rescued by Edward Luckenbach.
Maxwell	United States	With no one on board, the 14-gross register ton sidewheel motor paddle vessel sank in the Ohio River at Caseyville, Kentucky.
Ross	United Kingdom	The 240-foot (73 m) 1,384-ton vessel ran aground on rocks off Ireland. She got off but was leaking badly and foundered the next morning near North Bishop Rock. Her crew was picked up from her lifeboats by Argo.

=== 14 November ===
List of shipwrecks: 14 November 1906
Ship	State	Description
Calstock	Mexico	The 369-ton cargo vessel was wrecked 14 miles (23 km) east of Coatzacoalcos in the Bay of Campeche.
Emma Claudina	United States	The 195-gross register ton schooner sank off Cape Elizabeth in Grays Harbor on the coast of Washington. All eight people on board survived.
Icicle	United States	The 14-gross register ton motor vessel burned at Brents Wharf, Maryland. All five people on board survived.
James Fisk, Jr.	United States	The 914-gross register ton screw steamer burned in the St. Clair River on the Canada-United States border between Michigan and Ontario and was beached on St. Clair Flats. All 14 people on board survived.
Marshall Perrin	United States	The 142-ton vessel was wrecked near Fletcher's Neck, Maine.
Reform	Unknown British colony	The 545-ton vessel was wrecked at Barbuda.
Sir Isaac Lothian Bell	Canada	The barge was sunk in a collision with Seguin (Canada) in the St. Clair Rapids on the Canadian side of the St. Clair River in 20 feet (6.1 m) of water.

=== 15 November ===
List of shipwrecks: 11 December 1906
Ship	State	Description
James M. Hall	United States	The 87-gross register ton schooner was stranded in a strong wind, rain, and high seas at Long Branch, New Jersey. All four people on board were rescued by the United States Life Saving Service.
Lugano	United States	The 174-gross register ton schooner was stranded in a Gale with rain, hail and high seas at Point Judith in Narragansett Bay on the coast of Rhode Island with the loss of three lives. There were two survivors.
Madiera	Russian Empire	The 158-ton vessel was wrecked at the entrance to Windau, Russia.
Mary Lee Newton	United States	The 112-gross register ton schooner was stranded in Boston Harbor on the coast of Massachusetts. All four people on board made it to shore on the vessels boat.
Samuel C. Holmes	United States	The 79-gross register ton schooner was stranded on purpose to save the crew in a strong wind, rain, and high seas off Long Branch, New Jersey 1,500 yards (1,400 m) yards south of James M. Hall". All four people on board were rescued by the United States Life Saving Service.
Unknown canal boat	United States	The canal boat, under tow of the tug Geneva (United States), was damaged in a collision with the ferry John Englis (United States) off Grand Street, in the East River, She was towed to the foot of Rivington Street where she sank.

=== 16 November ===
List of shipwrecks: 16 November 1906
Ship	State	Description
City of Greenwood	United States	The 97-gross register ton sternwheel paddle steamer struck a snag and sank in the Mississippi River at Torras Landing off Torras, Louisiana, near the mouth of the Red River of the South. All 20 people on board survived.
Comenten	Sweden	The 468-ton barque was sunk in a collision off The Scaw, Denmark.
Freya	Sweden	The 199-ton vessel was wrecked at Flisau, Sweden.
J. D. Scott	United States	The steamer, while under tow, sprung a leak in a severe storm and sank off Pultneyville, New York.
Magda	Norway	The 209-foot (64 m), 1,109-ton barque was wrecked on Red Island, Newfoundland, Canada. Lost with all 17 hands
Margaret Dall	United States	The 149-gross register ton schooner dragged anchor was stranded in a Gale with rain and rough seas in Lake Michigan on South Manitou Island off the coast of Michigan . All five people on board survived.
Marshall Perrin	United States	The 149-gross register ton schooner was stranded and broke up at Fletchers Neck on Wood Island in Saco Bay on the coast of Maine after her anchor chains parted in a gale with snow, rain and hail. Her master perished and one of her two crewmen disappeared. Her other crewman washed ashore and was her sole survivor.
Unknown	United States	A dredge filled and sank in the channel of the Shrewsbury River one mile (1.6 km) south west of the Spermaceti Cove, New Jersey Life Saving Station with only her upper house above water.

=== 17 November ===
List of shipwrecks: 17 November 1906
Ship	State	Description
Australian	United Kingdom	The 2,838-ton cargo vessel was wrecked on Vashon Head off Port Essington, 130 miles (210 km) from Palmerston, Northern Territory, Australia. The crew were rescued by Pretoria.
Charles	Sweden	The 211-ton vessel was wrecked west of Hasselo.
Flyton	United States	The 553-gross register ton barge sank in the Gulf of Mexico. All four people on board survived.
Theano	United Kingdom	The Canadian-owned, British-registered steamer struck a rock a rock off Marvin Island four miles (6.4 km) east of Thunder Cape, Lake Superior and sank, storms later pushed her into deep water off Trowbridge Island. The crew abandoned ship in her boats.

=== 18 November ===
List of shipwrecks: 18 November 1906
Ship	State	Description
Belmont	United Kingdom	The 117.5-foot (35.8 m) trawler suffered mechanical failure and was driven ashore on Pilling Sands. The next day in a full gale the crew and a salvage team, 32 in all were taken off by the Fleetwood lifeboat "Maud Pickup" (United Kingdom). Refloated sometime in December, repaired and returned to service.
Dix	United States	The 130-gross register ton screw steamer sank after colliding with the steam screw schooner Jeannie (United States) in Puget Sound off Alki Point just outside the harbor of Seattle, Washington. Of the 76 people on board, either 40 or 45 (sources disagree) lost their lives.
Ida	Russian Empire	The 385-ton vessel was wrecked near Torhamn, Sweden.
Luis G. Rabel	United States	The 582-gross register ton schooner was stranded on Bull Island on the coast of South Carolina. All seven people on board survived.
Montebello	France	The 276.8-foot (84.4 m), 2,784-ton barque ran aground in bad weather on the south coast of Kangaroo Island, South Australia near the mouth of the Stun Sail Boom River, whilst on passage from Hobart to Port Pirie. Wreck located 15 February 1980.

=== 19 November ===
List of shipwrecks: 19 November 1906
Ship	State	Description
Perkins	United States	With no one on board, the 14-gross register ton sternwheel paddle motor vessel sank in the Cumberland River at Clarksville, Tennessee.

=== 20 November ===
List of shipwrecks: 20 November 1906
Ship	State	Description
Bun Hersey	United States	While no one was on board, the 35-gross register ton sternwheel paddle steamer burned to the waterline at either Stillwater or Duluth, Minnesota (sources disagree).
Frances B. Thurber	United States	The 131-gross register ton steam canal boat struck a submerged object in Long Island Sound 1/2 nautical mile (0.9 km; 0.6 mi) west-northwest of the Cornfield Point Lightship and sprang a leak. She was beached on Long Sand Shoal and was abandoned. All five people on boatrd survived.
Inger	Norway	The 2,459-ton cargo ship vessel was wrecked in a gale when her prop was fouled at Ocean Island in the Pacific Ocean.
Lothair	United Kingdom	The 164-ton vessel was wrecked on Goeree Bar, Netherlands.
Lydia Wheeler	United States	The steamer was tied to the bank of the Barren River at Bowling Green, Kentucky, when she was struck by a waterlogged barge that was drifting downriver, sinking her.
Mamie Doherty	United States	The canal boat grounded in the Hudson River off the mouth of Poesten Kill, Troy, New York, broke in two and was abandoned. Wreck had not been removed by June 1907.

=== 21 November ===
List of shipwrecks: 21 November 1906
Ship	State	Description
Conemaugh	United States	The 1,609-gross register ton screw steamer was wrecked in Lake Erie on Point Pelee, Ontario, during a gale. All 21 people on board survived, but she was declared a total loss.
Diamond	United States	The steamer rolled over on her side and sank from unknown causes in the Monongahela River at Pittsburgh, Pennsylvania off Twenty-Fifth Street. Raised, repaired, and returned to service.
Grayfield	United Kingdom	The 2121-ton vessel was wrecked on Robin Rigg, near the Solway Lightship.
Lurline	United States	The paddle steamer was rammed and sunk in fog in the Columbia River at Rainier, Oregon, by the steam schooner Cascade. She was refloated, repaired, and returned to service.
Panama	United States	The steamer sprang a leak during a gale and snow storm between Erie, Pennsylvania, and Superior, Wisconsin, and went ashore at the mouth of the Mineral River near Ontonagon, Michigan, and was wrecked. Her crew made it to shore in boats. Total loss.

=== 22 November ===
List of shipwrecks: 22 November
Ship	State	Description
Charles B. Hill	United States	The 1,731-gross register ton screw steamer was beached on the coast of Lake Erie 12 miles (19 km) east-northeast of the Fairport, Ohio, Life-Saving Station after springing a leak in high seas during a gale. All 21 people on board were rescued by the United States Life-Saving Service.
Chauncy Hurlbut	United States	The steamer developed leaks in heavy seas and was beached at Leamington, Ontario. Later pumped out and taken for repairs.
J. D. Scott	United States	The 87-gross register ton sidewheel paddle steamer was stranded in Lake Ontario off Pultneyville, New York. All three people on board survived.
Peter	Sweden	The 498-ton vessel was wrecked at Nienhagen.
Setagawa Maru	Japan	The 308-ton cargo vessel was wrecked near Nemuro, Hokkaido.
Swainby	United Kingdom	The 3,653-ton vessel was sunk in a collision off Hartland Point, Devon, England.

=== 23 November ===
List of shipwrecks: 23 November
Ship	State	Description
City of Loudon	United States	The 23-gross register ton sternwheel paddle steamer destroyed by fire at Florence, Alabama. All five people on board survived, but she was declared a total loss.
Gothe	Sweden	The 405-ton cargo ship vessel was wrecked near Landsort, Oja Island, Sweden.
Gerrittina	The Netherlands	The 30.36-metre (99.6 ft), 149-ton schooner was destroyed by fire at Elsfleth, Germany due to an explosion and fire in her cargo of barreled gasoline. The fire burned itself out at the end of the month.
Montanes	Spain	The 741-ton cargo ship vessel was wrecked at St. Alban's Head (50°34′N 02°03′W).

=== 24 November ===
List of shipwrecks: 24 November
Ship	State	Description
Gloria	United States	The 7-gross register ton motor vessel burned in Bowery Bay off the East River in New York City. All three people on board survived.
N. S. Hoskins	United States	The steamer burned in the New Basin Canal in New Orleans, Louisiana. She was declared a total loss.
Ophelia	Denmark	The 1,636-ton cargo vessel was wrecked at Lemvig, Denmark.
Solide	Sweden	The 363-ton vessel foundered off Steinort.

=== 25 November ===
List of shipwrecks: 25 November
Ship	State	Description
E. W. Sutton Jr.	United States	The steamer struck a rock and sank at Dunkirk, New York.
La Rabida	United States	The 52-gross register ton schooner was stranded at Naubinway, Michigan. All three people on board survived.

=== 26 November ===
List of shipwrecks: 26 November
Ship	State	Description
Acme	United States	The coal boat was damaged in a collision with Transfer No. 7 (United States) off Fourth Street, Long Island City, New York, in the East River and was beached.
Black Cat	United States	The motor boat was sunk in a collision with Jack Twophy (United States) in the Elizabeth River.

=== 27 November ===
List of shipwrecks: 27 November 1906
Ship	State	Description
Jennie G. Pillsbury	United States	The 154-gross register ton schooner was stranded on Two Bush Reef in Penobscot Bay on the coast of Maine. She floated off and was leaking badly, she rolled over and drifted out to sea. She eventually drifted ashore near the Burnt Island, Maine Life Saving Station. All four people on board were rescued by the United States Life Saving Service.
Tecumseh	United Kingdom	The steamer was wrecked in strong wind and heavy seas 8 miles north west of the Marblehead, Ohio Life Saving Station.

=== 28 November ===
List of shipwrecks: 28 November 1906
Ship	State	Description
Queen of the lakes	Canada	The 129-foot (39 m), 337-ton schooner sprung a leak in a gale and sank shortly after midnight approximately 8 miles off Sodus Point, New York in Lake Ontario. Her crew reached shore in her boat. Wreck located August 2009.

=== 29 November ===
List of shipwrecks: 29 November 1906
Ship	State	Description
137S	Regia Marina	The 72S-class torpedo boat was wrecked off Favignana, Sicily.
John R. Zimmerman	United States	The 336-gross register ton barge was stranded at the mouth of the Elizabeth River on the coast of Virginia. Both people on board survived.
Kinsei Maru	Japan	The 1,427-ton cargo vessel was wrecked on Quelpart.
Reindeer	United States	With no one on board, the 14-gross register ton schooner sank in Broad Cove off Eastport, Maine.
Robbie	United States	The steamer was tied to the bank at Grand Bayou, Louisiana, when out going tide left her grounded, she rolled over and sank. Was scheduled to be raised.
Sugarland	United States	The steamer was damaged in a collision with an oil barge in the Atchafalaya River at the Lagonda Bridge, she was beached to prevent sinking.

=== 30 November ===
List of shipwrecks: 30 November 1906
Ship	State	Description
Ancona	United Kingdom	The 280.2-foot (85.4 m), 2,852-ton barque was destroyed by fire in the Bay of Biscay.
Belle Dijonnaise	France	The 121-ton schooner was wrecked on The Hinder, or in the Bokkegat.
Celtic	United Kingdom	The 170-ton vessel suffered a broken propeller shaft and was sunk in a collision with a vessel coming to her assistance in the North Sea.
Monarch	Netherlands	The 140-ton fishing vessel foundered in the North Sea.
Trilby	United States	The steamer capsized during a heavy squall near Antioch, California. Raised and repaired.

=== Unknown date ===
List of shipwrecks: Unknown date 1906
Ship	State	Description
A. J. McKeon	unknown	November gale of 1906:The schooner was wrecked on Prince Edward Island on the next to the last day of the gale. Some sources say gale ended on 6 Nov, others say 17 Nov.
All Grand	United States	The tug was lost in a storm on Lake Erie sometime in November.
Alsternix	Germany	The barque departed from Callao, Peru for Melbourne, Australia on 26 November. No further trace, presumed foundered in the Pacific Ocean with the loss of all hands.
Athens	United States	The steamer was lost in a storm on Lake Erie sometime in November.
Bay City	United States	The steamer was lost in a storm on Lake Erie sometime in November.
Little Malta	United Kingdom	The steam trawler sank in the Teifi Estuary.
Pratt	United States	The steamer was lost in a storm on Lake Erie sometime in November.
Ruth	United States	The steamer was tied to the shore, New Orleans area, and was stranded by dropping water with her stern sunk low in the mud sometime in November. Was expected to be raised.
Wagner	United States	The tug was lost in a storm on Lake Erie sometime in November.

== December ==
=== 1 December ===
List of shipwrecks: 1 December 1906
Ship	State	Description
Adam W. Spies	United States	The 1,222-gross register ton schooner was stranded in the Gulf of Mexico 40 nautical miles (74 km) west of Stirrup Key (24.7418°N 81.0423°W) in the Florida Keys. All 10 people on board survived.
Charles G. Hill	United States	The 192-gross register ton barge sank in 50 feet (15 m) of water in the Hudson River off Marlborough, New York, her mast sticking several feet above the water. The only person on board survived. Wreck removed by 17 December.
Johanna	Sweden	The 178-ton vessel was stranded near Calmar. Refloated and condemned at Calmar.

=== 2 December ===
List of shipwrecks: 2 December 1906
Ship	State	Description
Alma	Sweden	The 129-ton vessel was wrecked at Saltbaden, near Karlskrona.
Morven	United Kingdom	The 2,000-ton cargo barque was wrecked at Horse Island, Dunmore Head, Kilbaha, Shannon Estuary, County Clare, Ireland, United Kingdom.
Petrel	United States	The steamer caught fire and sank in 40 feet (12 m) of water near the White River, Michigan Life Saving Station.
Virginian	United States	The 309-gross register ton barge was stranded at Branford, Connecticut. The only person on board survived.

=== 3 December ===
List of shipwrecks: 3 December 1906
Ship	State	Description
A. P. Emerson	United States	The 243-gross register ton schooner sank off Cape Sable, Newfoundland. All six people on board survived.
Captain Jameson	United States	The barge went ashore at Mumford Cove, near Groton Long Point, Connecticut.
Emilie Andrea	France	The 119-ton vessel was wrecked 5 miles (8.0 km) east of Louisbourg, Nova Scotia.
Insularenen	Denmark	The 210-ton schooner sprung a leak and sank 60 miles (97 km) south of Toulon, or south of Marseille, in the Mediterranean Sea. The crew were rescued by Valkyrien (Sweden).
John	Sweden	The 136-ton vessel was wrecked near Fårö, north of Gotland, Sweden.
Providence	United States	The 1,651-gross register ton iron-hulled schooner barge or scow barge was abandoned in the North Atlantic Ocean east of North Carolina at 34°06′N 074°47′W. All eight people on board survived.
Thomas M. Righter	United States	The barge sank a one-half mile (0.80 km) off the Southwest Ledge Light, New Haven, Connecticut.
Twins	United States	The 27-gross register ton steam catamaran was destroyed by fire on the White River at Gainer's Ferry near Batesville, Arkansas. All eight people on board survived.
Virginian	United States	The barge sank in heavy seas between the Branford Beacon and the Southwest Ledge Light, New Haven, Connecticut.

=== 4 December ===
List of shipwrecks: 4 December 1906
Ship	State	Description
Alert	United States	The 145-gross register ton motor vessel was stranded at Port au Port, Newfoundland, with the loss of one life. There were 11 survivors.
Catherine	Norway	The 127-ton vessel was wrecked in the Crozet Islands, northwest of Kerguelen in the southern Indian Ocean.
Emma R. Harvey	United States	The 286-gross register ton schooner was stranded in Digby Gut on the coast of Nova Scotia with the loss of two lives. There were five survivors.
Stella	United States	The 82-gross register ton sternwheel paddle steamer burned at Greenwood, Mississippi, at the confluence of the Tallahatchie, Yalobusha, and Yazoo Rivers. All 28 people on board survived.

=== 5 December ===
List of shipwrecks: 5 December 1906
Ship	State	Description
Geneva	United States	The tug was damaged in a collision with the tug Delaware (United States) off the Morris Canal basin, Jersey City, New Jersey, and was beached, but sank.

=== 6 December ===
List of shipwrecks: 6 December 1906
Ship	State	Description
Bonny Doon	United States	The 570-gross register ton barkentine was stranded on Stone Horse Shoal on the coast of Massachusetts, sinking in 16 to 20 feet of water. Wreck removed with Dynamite starting between 21 and 24 January 1907, halted by weather and finishing between 24 March and 1 April 1907. All eight people on board survived.
Cretan	United States	The passenger steamer was grounded across the river from Philadelphia, Pennsylvania on flats off Pettys Island where fireboats from Philadelphia extinguished a fire in her holds that had started on 5 December off Absecon Lighthouse. Pumped out on 7 December.
Emily	Sweden	The 1,105-ton cargo ship vessel was wrecked 1 nautical mile (1.9 km) from Hafringe Lighthouse.
Florence I. Lockwood	United States	The 299-gross register ton schooner was stranded and sank on Williams Shoal at Chincoteague Inlet on the coast of Virginia. All six people on board were rescued by the United States Life Saving Service.
Great Admiral	United States	The 1,575-gross register ton full-rigged ship sank in a gale in the North Pacific Ocean 200 nautical miles (370 km; 230 mi) west of Cape Flattery, Washington, with the loss of her cook and a cabin Boy who died of exposure after the sinking. 16 survivors were rescued from debris on 8 December by Barcoe (United Kingdom).
Monarch	United States	The bow section of SS Monarch The passenger-package freighter strayed off course and was wrecked when she ran into the palisade area on the north side of Blake Point on Isle Royale in Lake Superior at full speed at night with the loss of one life. All other passengers and crew evacuated safely onto Isle Royale, where they camped for four days until rescued on 10 December 1906. During the night of 11–12 December 1906, the wreck broke into two pieces, leaving only the bow section visible.

=== 7 December ===
List of shipwrecks: 7 December 1906
Ship	State	Description
Buena Vista	United States	The 1,600-gross register ton steel-hulled schooner barge or scow barge, under tow of W. A. Luckenbach (United States), foundered in a northeast gale 1.5 nautical miles (2.8 km; 1.7 mi) east-southeast of Montauk Point, Long Island, New York, with the loss of three crewmen. There were two survivors.
Coloma	United States	The 852-gross register ton bark was abandoned in the Pacific Ocean off Cape Beale, Vancouver Island, British Columbia in a gale and heavy seas 15 miles west of the Strait of San Juan, eventually going ashore and breaking up on Vargas Island. All ten people on board were rescued by a boat from lighthouse tender Quadra (Canada).
Ella Rohlffs	United States	Carrying 10 passengers, a crew of 12, and a 10-ton cargo of empty beer kegs, lumber, and miscellaneous boxes on a voyage from Howkan to Ketchikan, District of Alaska, with a stop at Coppermount, the 149-gross register ton, 75.5-foot (23.0 m) steamer ran aground during a snowstorm on the north end of Long Island in the Alexander Archipelago in Southeast Alaska about 10 nautical miles (19 km; 12 mi) north of Howkan without loss of life. The steamer Cordova (United States) took off her passengers on 8 December.
Isle of Iona	United Kingdom	The 1,139-ton vessel was wrecked near Whitby, England.
Rancocas	United States	The lighter was damaged in a collision with a float towed by the tug W. H. Flannery (United States) off Pier 6, North River and was abandoned by her crew. After being abandoned she had a slight collision with the tug S. O. Co. No. 14 (United States), she was then towed by W. H. Flannery to the Bedloe Island flats where she sank.
Sea Witch	United States	The 1,289-gross register ton full-rigged ship or barque became waterlogged and was abandoned in the Pacific Ocean at (45°41′N 127°30′W). All 16 people on board survived.

=== 8 December ===
List of shipwrecks: 8 December 1906
Ship	State	Description
Charles L. Mitchell	United States	The 597-gross register ton schooner was abandoned off Cape Henry, Virginia. All seven people on board survived.
Clara	Norway	The 430-ton vessel was wrecked at Fleetwood, England.
Heinrich Gehrke	Germany	The 1,278-ton vessel foundered off Rixhoft.
Wellington	Norway	The 239.9-foot (73.1 m), 1,246-ton full rigged ship was abandoned in the Atlantic Ocean north of Bermuda (34°29′N 65°40′W).
William F. Hallstead	United States	The 18-gross register ton screw steamer burned on Lake Erie at Dunkirk, New York. All five people on board survived.
William Marshall	United States	The 305-gross register ton schooner was abandoned in a waterlogged condition. She stranded off Highland Light on Cape Cod on the coast of Massachusetts on 11 December, and broke up in a storm later in the month. All six people on board survived.

=== 9 December ===
List of shipwrecks: 9 December 1906
Ship	State	Description
Amyalane	Sweden	The 374-ton vessel was wrecked near Klintehamn, Gotland, Sweden.
Heathpool	United Kingdom	The 3,828-ton vessel was wrecked near the Outer Dowsing Lightship in a storm. The crew of 24 and a maritime pilot were lost.

=== 10 December ===
List of shipwrecks: 10 December 1906
Ship	State	Description
Anitza	Greece	The 357-ton vessel was wrecked near Faraman.
Atrato	British Honduras	The 107.6-foot (32.8 m), 215-ton schooner was wrecked at Liverpool, Nova Scotia.
Segesta	Italy	The 1,782-ton vessel was sunk in a collision with Lula (Greece) off Cyrenaica, Italian Libya.
Victoria	Unknown	The passenger steamer was sunk in 15 feet (4.6 m) of water at Brockville, Ontario.

=== 11 December ===
List of shipwrecks: 11 December 1906
Ship	State	Description
J. J. Stewart	United States	The 51-gross register ton schooner sank in the James River in Virginia. All four people on board survived.

=== 12 December ===
List of shipwrecks: 12 December 1906
Ship	State	Description
Atlantic	Canada	The schooner was wrecked off Goose Island, Isaac's Harbour, Nova Scotia.
Gen′l J. L. Selfridge	United States	The 20-gross register ton schooner was stranded at Fisherman Island on the coast of Virginia. Both people on board survived.
John M. Nicol	United States	The 2,126-gross register ton screw steamer ran aground on Big Summer Island in Michigan during a snowstorm and broke up. All 21 people on board survived.
Kinrio Maru or "Kinryo Maru"	Japan	The 172.9-foot (52.7 m) 531-ton cargo ship foundered in the mouth of the River Wahamatsu.
Marietta	United States	The 9-gross register ton motor vessel sank in West Pass at Apalachicola Bay on the coast of Florida. All three people on board survived.

=== 14 December ===
List of shipwrecks: 14 December 1906
Ship	State	Description
Columbia	United States	The tug struck an obstruction in the Patapsco River and developed a leak. She sank after making it to dock. Later raised.
Edgar Randall	United States	The 62-gross register ton schooner was lost when she collided with the screw steamer Delta (Netherlands) off Mobile, Alabama. All eight people on board survived.
Emerald	Norway	The 645-ton cargo vessel was wrecked on Vlieland, The Netherlands.
No. 7	United States	The 65-gross register ton scow was lost when she collided with the screw steamer Milwaukee (United States) at Lime Kiln Crossing in the Detroit River on the Canada-United States border between Michigan and Ontario. All nine people on board survived.
Themis	Norway	During a voyage from Ketchikan, District of Alaska, to Crofton, British Columbia, carrying a load of copper ore and canned salmon, the 270-foot (82 m) steam cargo ship struck Crocker Rock 2 nautical miles (3.7 km; 2.3 mi) northwest of Scarlett Point on Vancouver Island and sank without loss of life.

=== 15 December ===
List of shipwrecks: 15 December 1906
Ship	State	Description
Belvedere	Italy	The 155-ton vessel was wrecked at Vassiliki, Santa Maura.
James Gordon Bennett	United States	The 70-gross register ton schooner, a pilot boat, was sunk in a collision with the screw steamer Monterey (United States) off Sandy Hook, New Jersey. All 10 people on board survived. Note: In 1897, the James Gordon Bennett was bought by Miller J. Morse of the Atlantic Yacht Club and made into a yacht. He changed her name to Hermit.
Newark	United States	After suffering a fire in her port coal bunker earlier in the day, the 59-gross register ton tow screw steamer reignited at 8 P.M. and got out of hand and she sank at dock at Mill's Shipyard in Camden, New Jersey, because of a fire in her starboard coal bunker. Her after house and decks was destroyed. All four people on board survived.
Surprise	United Kingdom	The 197-ton vessel was wrecked on Ardmore Island.
The Rose	United Kingdom	The 142-ton vessel was sunk in a collision off The Nash.

=== 16 December ===
List of shipwrecks: 16 December 1906
Ship	State	Description
Adventurer	United States	With no one on board, the 16-gross register ton screw steamer was stranded at Ontonagon, Michigan.
Billiton	Straits Settlements	The 137.8-foot (42.0 m) 302-ton vessel struck a coral reef and foundered off the Natuna Islands, Netherlands East Indies.
Dybvaag	Norway	The 255.5-foot (77.9 m), 1,771-ton full rigged ship was wrecked at Les Escoumins, Quebec, Canada.
Nordwind	Germany	The 1,242-ton vessel was wrecked at Whalsay Skerries.
Norwich	United States	The sidewheel wrecking steamer caught fire at dock at Rondout, New York, and later sank when her seacocks were open to put out the fire. The vessel was scheduled to be raised in Spring 1907.
Prinzessin Victoria Luise	Germany	The passenger ship ran aground off Plum Point, Kingston, Jamaica, and was wrecked. The wreck sank during a seaquake in 1907.
Vanloo	Italy	The 1,533-ton vessel was wrecked 25 miles (40 km) east of Pensacola, Florida.

=== 17 December ===
List of shipwrecks: 17 December 1906
Ship	State	Description
Cap Juby	Belgium	The steamer sank after colliding with the steamer Arlington (United Kingdom) in the English Channel 15 nautical miles (28 km) off Dungeness, Kent, United Kingdom.
Fremad	Denmark	The 324-ton vessel was wrecked at St. Croix, Danish West Indies.
Maria	Greece	The 935-ton vessel was wrecked in the Gulf of Kenidjez, off Rhodes.

=== 18 December ===
List of shipwrecks: 18 December 1906
Ship	State	Description
Dania	Norway	The 897-ton cargo vessel was wrecked at Jaederen, Norway.

=== 19 December ===
List of shipwrecks: 19 December 1906
Ship	State	Description
Charlotte Ann Pigot	United States	The 28-gross register ton schooner was stranded at Port Royal, South Carolina. All three people on board survived.
Elfrida	United Kingdom	The 2,257-ton vessel was sunk in a collision with Glenlee (United Kingdom) in thick fog off Flamborough Head. The crew were rescued by Glenlee.
Gjertrud	Denmark	The 144-ton vessel was sunk in a collision in the English Channel.
P. T. Barnum	United States	The 667-gross register ton schooner was abandoned in the North Atlantic Ocean 30 nautical miles (56 km; 35 mi) east of Bodie Island in the Outer Banks of North Carolina. All eight people on board survived.
W. T. Scovell	United States	The 244-gross register ton sternwheel paddle steamer was wrecked when her boilers exploded on the Mississippi River at Gold Dust Landing 17 miles below Vicksburg, Mississippi. Of the 65 people on board, either 10 (her master, eight crewmen, and one passenger) or 12 were killed, according to different sources.

=== 20 December ===
List of shipwrecks: 20 December 1906
Ship	State	Description
Lottie	United States	With no one on board, the 9-gross register ton motor vessel was stranded at Brooklyn, New York.

=== 21 December ===
List of shipwrecks: 21 December 1906
Ship	State	Description
Dido	Russian Empire	The 324-ton vessel was wrecked on Karlos.
Edgar	United States	The 15-gross register ton scow sank at Everett, Washington. The only person on board survived.
Strathcona	Canada	The passenger steamer caught fire and was beached off Port Dufferin, Nova Scotia.
Tilley	United Kingdom	The ketch sprang a leak in the Bristol Channel and was abandoned. Her three crew were rescued by Ragusa 2 (United Kingdom).

=== 22 December ===
List of shipwrecks: 22 December 1906
Ship	State	Description
Arrow	Unknown British colony	The 183-ton vessel was wrecked at Sabana Grande de Palenque, St. Domingo.
Beatrice	United Kingdom	The 712-ton vessel was wrecked at the mouth of the harbour at Sydney, Nova Scotia.
Kong Enge	Denmark	The 688-ton vessel was wrecked in Skjalfand Bay Iceland.
Strathconia	Canada	The 284-ton vessel burned off Port Dufferin.

=== 23 December ===
List of shipwrecks: 23 December 1906
Ship	State	Description
Three Sisters	United States	The sail vessel sank in a collision in the Patapsco River near Seven Foot Knoll, Maryland, with the tug Peerless (United States). The crew were rescued.

=== 24 December ===
List of shipwrecks: 24 December 1906
Ship	State	Description
Casper Heft	United States	The 107-gross register ton schooner was stranded at Smiths Point, Virginia. All four people on board survived.
Lytton	United Kingdom	Fire following the explosion The petroleum barge exploded on a slipway at Dalla, British Burma.
Patra	United Kingdom	The 101.4-foot (30.9 m), 183-ton brig was wrecked on a sandbank near Norderney, Germany and broke up. Her crew left in her 3 boats and were rescued.

=== 25 December ===
List of shipwrecks: 25 December 1906
Ship	State	Description
Chinkai Maru	Japan	The 2,173-ton cargo vessel was wrecked at the entrance to the Shimonoseki Strait.
Endeavour	United Kingdom	The 226-ton vessel was wrecked at Providence.
Teutonic	United Kingdom	The 105.3-foot (32.1 m), 152-ton steam trawler sank in the North Sea.

=== 26 December ===
List of shipwrecks: 26 December 1906
Ship	State	Description
Alfred	United Kingdom	The 100-ton vessel was wrecked at Aldeburgh, England.
Carrollton	United States	The 1,450-gross register ton bark was stranded at Midway Atoll in the Pacific Ocean. All 15 people on board survived.
Hazeldene	United Kingdom	The 292-foot (89 m), 2,204-ton vessel was wrecked in snow squalls and sleet on Cannon Rock, 3 miles (4.8 km) from Cloughy, County Down, Ireland, U.K.
Laurel	United States	The 16-gross register ton screw steamer burned at Keyport, Washington. All three people on board survived.
Regia	Norway	The 496-ton vessel was wrecked on The Goodwins.
Ringleader	United Kingdom	The 167-ton vessel was wrecked at Dungeness, England.

=== 27 December ===
List of shipwrecks: 27 December 1906
Ship	State	Description
Jumbo	United States	The 14-gross register ton screw steamer burned at Mobile, Alabama. All four people on board survived.
Redwood	United Kingdom	The 1,197-ton vessel was wrecked at Wyk.

=== 29 December ===
List of shipwrecks: 29 December 1906
Ship	State	Description
Alice McDonald	United States	The schooner stranded on Jetty Sands four miles (6.4 km) west north west of the Point Adams, Oregon Life Saving Station. Refloated 14 January 1907.
Elin	Sweden	The 890-ton vessel was stranded on Fuglehuk. refloated and condemned.
Orion	Sweden	The 1,097-ton vessel was sunk in a collision in The Humber.
Paterson	United States	The 1,057-gross register ton steel-hulled steam sidewheel paddle ferry sank with the loss of one life after colliding with the schooner barge Flora (United States) – towed by the tug Joshua Lovett (United States) – in the North River off Christopher Street in 65 feet (20 m) of water in New York City. Joshua Lovett and the tug John S. Smith (United States) rescued Paterson's 14 survivors. Wreck reduced in height to 43 feet (13 m) clearance by June 1907.
Ralph F. Hodgdon	United States	The 90-gross register ton schooner burned in the Bay of Islands on the coast of Newfoundland. All six people on board survived.

=== 30 December ===
List of shipwrecks: 30 December 1906
Ship	State	Description
Creve Coeur	United States	The 12-gross register ton sternwheel motor paddle vessel sank at Tiptonville, Tennessee. Both people on board survived.
Lavinia	United States	The 40-gross register ton schooner was stranded at Waikiki on Oahu, Hawaii. All five people on board survived.

=== 31 December ===
List of shipwrecks: 31 December 1906
Ship	State	Description
Santa Fe	United States	The steamer sank at dock during a heavy gale at San Diego, California. Raised and repaired.

== Unknown date ==
List of shipwrecks: Unknown date 1906
Ship	State	Description
Alfred W.	United States	The tug struck a rock and sank off Pie Island in 60 feet (18 m) of water in either January, June or July. Raised, repaired and returned to service.
Annie	United States	The 15-gross register ton schooner was stranded at Brunswick, Georgia. Both people on board survived.
Anominos	Ottoman Empire	The 372-ton vessel was wrecked at Brindisi sometime in 1906.
Aztec	United States	With no one on board, the 22-gross register ton motor paddle vessel was stranded in the Colorado River in the Arizona Territory.
Bergen	Norway	The lifeboat was lost during a rescue operation off Stave, Andøya.
Carita	United States	The vessel was lost in the Inside Passage in Tongass Narrows in the Alexander Archipelago in Southeast Alaska near Ketchikan, District of Alaska.
Catherine	United States	With no one aboard, the 12-gross register ton sloop-rigged yacht sank in the Christiana River in Delaware.
Colombia	Norway	The 1,202-ton vessel departed Wallaroo, Australia on 26 January for Falmouth and vanished.
C. Paulsen	Germany	The 701-ton barque departed Cuxhaven, Germany on 31 January and vanished.
Eridan	France	The 927-ton vessel was lost sometime in 1906.
Gracie	United States	With no one on board, the 40-gross register ton schooner was stranded on the Savannah River in Georgia.
Harvest Home	United States	The 78-gross register ton schooner was lost when she collided with an unidentified British vessel off Cape Cod, Massachusetts. All three people on board survived.
Helvecia II	Argentina	The small cargo carrying tugboat departed San Carlos de Bariloche sometime in 1906 and vanished on Lake Nahuel Huapi. Wreck located in 2024.
Ina Mactavish	United Kingdom	The 65-foot (20 m) 80-ton coastal lighter sank. She was refloated, lengthened to 77 ft (23 m), repaired, and returned to service.
Jorgen Bang	Norway	The 675-ton vessel departed Surabaya, Netherlands East Indies on 22 March for Delagoa Bay, Portuguese Mozambique. Last seen in the Bali Strait on 28 March and vanished.
Oregon	United States	The steamer sunk sometime in 1906 in the Menominee River at Milwaukee, Wisconsin. She was refloated in mid 1907.
Polly	United States	The steam tug sank in the Yukon River.
Rodenbek	Germany	The 1,602-ton brigantine departed Liverpool on 23 January for Australia and vanished after being spoken to on 12 February at 13°N 27°W.
Sandbeck	United Kingdom	The 293-ton vessel sank in the River Niger sometime in 1906.
Sorata	Norway	The 733-ton vessel departed Apia, Samoa on 25 January for Marseille and vanished.
Stetson and Ellison	United States	The 56-gross register ton schooner sank in Delaware Bay. All four people on board survived.
Theodor	Norway	The 2,311-ton vessel sailed from Port Tampa, Florida for Yokohama, Japan on 2 March and vanished.
West Side	United States	The United States Department of Commerce and Labor publication Thirty-Ninth Annual List of Merchant Vessels of the United States for the Year Ending 30 June 1907, reported that the 324-gross register ton schooner was stranded in Georgian Bay near Parry Sound, Ontario, Canada, on an unidentified date. All six people on board survived.
