= Sandy Islands (Manitoba) =

Island group in Manitoba, Canada

Coordinates: 52°58′N 97°58′W

Sandy Islands is a group of four islands located in the northern basin on Lake Winnipeg in the Canadian province of Manitoba. The Sandy Islands together with Little George Island, George Island and the Spider Islands form a chain of islands, which are a continuation of The Pas Moraine.

The largest island within the group is Big Sandy Island, located approximately 47 kilometers (29 mi) west from the mouth of the Poplar River on the eastern shore, and approximately 32 kilometers (20 mi) east from the easternmost tip of the Long Point on the western shore of Lake Winnipeg.

Other islands in the group are Little Sandy Island to northwest of the main island, and Cannibal Island to southeast. The smallest island is located in the narrow strait between Little Sandy and Big Sandy islands.

The islands are uninhabited with no man-made structures present.
