= SS Princess =

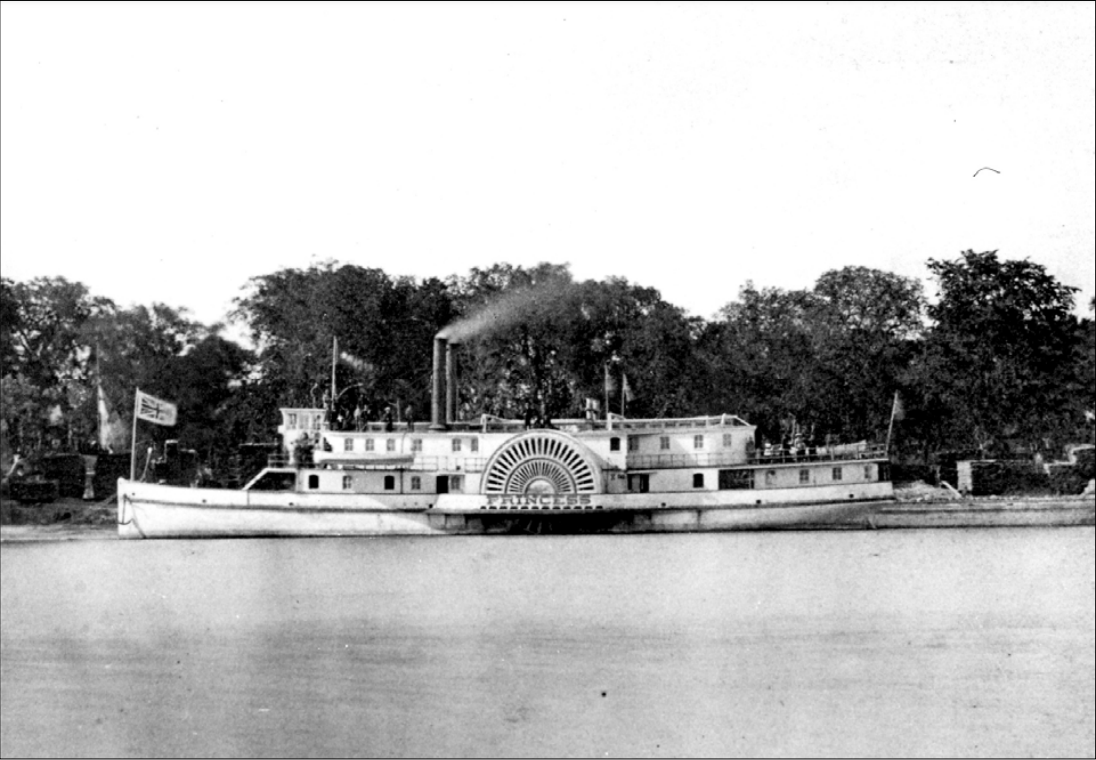

History
- Builder: Jarvis & Burridge
- Fate: Sank 1906

General characteristics
- Type: Steamboat
- Length: 49 m (161 ft) (c.1885–)
- Propulsion: paddlewheels (1881–c.1885); 4-blade propeller (c.1885–)
- Speed: 25 knots (46 km/h; 29 mph)

SS Princess was a steamboat that operated on Lake Winnipeg in Canada from 1881 until 1906. The vessel was built in Winnipeg, Manitoba by the Jarvis & Burridge shipyard, and it was regarded as the pride of Lake Winnipeg and as the finest lake steamer west from the Great Lakes and east from the Rocky Mountains. The vessel has a total of 40 spacious passenger cabins, and outwardly it resembled many of the Mississippi River paddle steamers. The vessel had a top speed of approximately 25 knots.

In 1885, together with SS Colvile, Princess moved the thousand men that had participated the North-West Rebellion from Grand Rapids, Manitoba to Winnipeg.

Soon after 1885 the vessel faced downgrading. The passenger cabins were removed and she was downgraded to a cargo vessel. The paddlewheels and the original steam engine were replaced with a new steam engine and a four-blade propeller. During the work the hull was also lengthened to 49 metres (161 ft). Only six cabins, a kitchen and a small dining room were left. After the work the vessel was primarily used to carry bulky goods and railroad ties, and often she was towing a barge.

Her career ended in an autumn storm in 1906. On 24 August Princess left from the Spider Islands and headed towards Little George Island carrying 1,600 boxes of fish. The weather was fine until, at about 6:00pm, a strong north-eastern wind rose. After Princess had rounded the Little George Island, Captain Hawes turned her for the Berens Island. As the winds turned into a storm the crew urged the captain to seek shelter from George Island.

Finally, as the storm grew stronger Captain Hawes ordered to turn the vessel around and ordered "full speed ahead." This double order proved to be her fate. As the vessel turned, and had turned about half-way around the hull was torn asunder by the fury of 8-metre (26 ft) waves, trapping three of crew below. The passengers and crew quickly moved into two small lifeboats, but Captain Hawes, 17-year-old cabin servant Flora McDonald of Selkirk, and 19-year-old cook Johanna Palsdottir never made the last boat. Also lost were 19-year-old sailor Johann Jonsson, Loftur Gudmundsson of Gimli, and Charles Greyeyes, native Canadian.

Both lifeboats survived the storm. The first one landed on Berens Island, and the other one made it the shore near the village of Berens River, where the survivors were picked up the next day by SS City of Selkirk.

Six people were lost in the accident, and only two bodies were ever found. One of the bodies was Captain Hawes, wearing nothing but the straps of the life preserver. Everything else was torn away.
