= List of lighthouses in Manitoba =

This is a list of lighthouses in the province of Manitoba, Canada.

== Lighthouses ==
Name	Year built	Waterbody	Location & coordinates	Class of Light	Focal height (metres)	CCG no.	Range (nautical miles)
Black Bear Island Light	1898		Selkirk	Inactive			
Cox Reef Light	1905	Lake Winnipeg	Manitoba	Fl W 4s	15.2	1600	
Gimli Light	1973	Lake Winnipeg	Gimli	Fl R 4s	12.8	1569	
George Island Light	1906	Lake Winnipeg	George Island	Fl W 4s	20	I1608	9
Gull Harbour Lighthouse	1898	Lake Winnipeg	Manitoba				
Gull Harbour Lighthouse	1926	Lake Winnipeg	Manitoba	Fl W 5s	27.4	1583	7
Hecla Island Range Rear Light		Lake Winnipeg	Manitoba	F W	15.2	1579	14
Red River Range Light	1914		Selkirk	Inactive			
Warren Landing Lower Range Front Light	1908	Lake Winnipeg	Manitoba	F W	7.5	1620	
Warren Landing Lower Range Rear Light	1908	Lake Winnipeg	Manitoba	F W	17	1621	
Warren Landing Upper Range Front Light	1908	Lake Winnipeg	Division No. 22	F W	9	1622	
Warren Landing Upper Range Rear Light	1908	Lake Winnipeg	Division No. 22	F W	15	1623	
Winnipeg Beach Breakwater Light	2001	Lake Winnipeg	Winnipeg Beach	Fl R 4s	10.8	1565	

== See also ==
- List of lighthouses in Canada
