= Stun'sail Boom, South Australia =

Stun'sail Boom
- Town
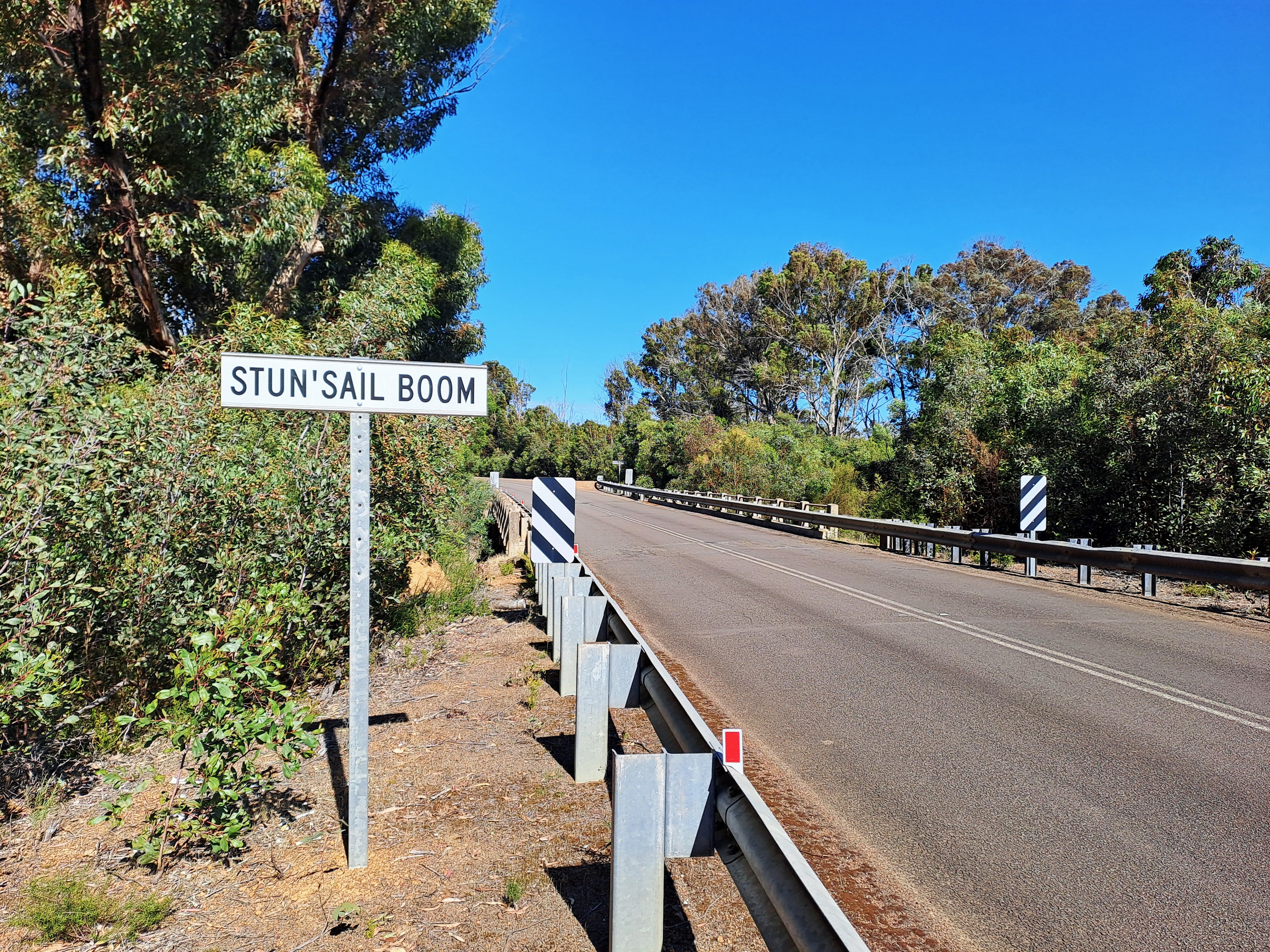
- Bridge over the Stun'sail Boom River in Stun'sail Boom (locality)

- Coordinates: 36.010360°S 137.027840°E
- Country: Australia
- State: South Australia
- Region: Fleurieu and Kangaroo Island
- LGA: Kangaroo Island Council
- Location: 186 km (116 mi) southwest of Adelaide; 68 km (42 mi) southwest of Kingscote
- Established: 2002

Government
  - State electorate: Mawson
  - Federal division: Mayo

Population
  - Total: 7 (SAL 2021)
- Time zone: UTC+9:30 (ACST)
  - Summer (DST): UTC+10:30 (ACST)
- Postcode: 5223
- County: County of Carnarvon
- Mean max temp: 22.1 °C (71.8 °F)
- Mean min temp: 11.5 °C (52.7 °F)
- Annual rainfall: 534.0 mm (21.02 in)
Localities around Stun'sail Boom
Karatta	Karatta; Vivonne Bay	Vivonne Bay
Karatta	Stun'sail Boom	Vivonne Bay
Ocean	Ocean	Ocean
- Coordinates; Locations; Climate; Adjoining localities

Stun’sail Boom is a locality in the Australian state of South Australia located on the south coast of Kangaroo Island overlooking the body of water known in Australia as the Southern Ocean and by international authorities as the Great Australian Bight. It is located about 186 kilometres (116 miles) southwest of the state capital of Adelaide and about 68 kilometres (42 miles) southwest of the municipal seat of Kingscote.

Its boundaries were created in May 2002 for the “long established name” which is derived from the river located within its boundaries.

The land use within the locality consists of agriculture and conservation.

The locality includes the Tilka Huts, Shed and Graves Site which is listed on the South Australian Heritage Register

Stun’sail Boom is located within the federal division of Mayo, the state electoral district of Mawson and the local government area of the Kangaroo Island Council.
