= George Island Light =

- Location: George Island, George Island, Manitoba, Canada
- Coordinates: 52°49′10″N 97°36′52″W

Tower
- Constructed: 1906
- Construction: steel skeletal tower
- Automated: 1981
- Height: 15.5 m (51 ft)
- Shape: square tower with balcony and lantern
- Markings: red (tower), white (lantern)
- Operator: Canadian Coast Guard

Light
- First lit: 1906
- Focal height: 20 m (66 ft)
- Range: 9 nmi (17 km; 10 mi)
- Characteristic: Fl W 4s

George Island Light is a lighthouse located on George Island that lies in the middle of the North Basin of Lake Winnipeg in the Canadian province of Manitoba. It is located approximately 400 km (250 mi) north from Winnipeg, and approximately halfway between the shore communities of Grand Rapids and Poplar River.

The lighthouse structure is 15.5 metres (51 ft) tall square pyramidal steel skeletal tower painted red, with enclosed lantern room on top, painted white. The lantern has a focal plane of 20 metres (66 ft) and it displays a white flash every four seconds visible in all directions. The light is maintained by the Canadian Coast Guard.

The lighthouse was built in 1906 to aid navigation in the treacherous North Basin. It had a lighthouse keeper until 1981. The George Island Light was the last lighthouse to be fitted as a fully automatic light. The last lighthouse keeper, Mr. Willard Olson, served on George Island every year starting from 1951 until 1981.

== See also ==
- List of lighthouses in Manitoba
- List of lighthouses in Canada
