= Duck Islands =

Island group in Ontario, Canada

Geography
- Location: Lake Huron, Manitoulin District, Ontario, Canada
- Coordinates: 45°40′40″N 82°56′42″W

The Duck Islands is a chain of five islands within the Canadian waters of Lake Huron, located southwest of Manitoulin Island and within the Manitoulin District. The largest island within the chain is known as Great Duck Island while the others are named for their location in the chain: Inner Duck, Middle Duck, Outer Duck, and Western Duck. Passing between the Duck Islands and Manitoulin Island should not be attempted due to dangerous reefs.
