= Stun'sail Boom River =

Stun'sail Boom Stunsail Boom; Stuns'l Boom
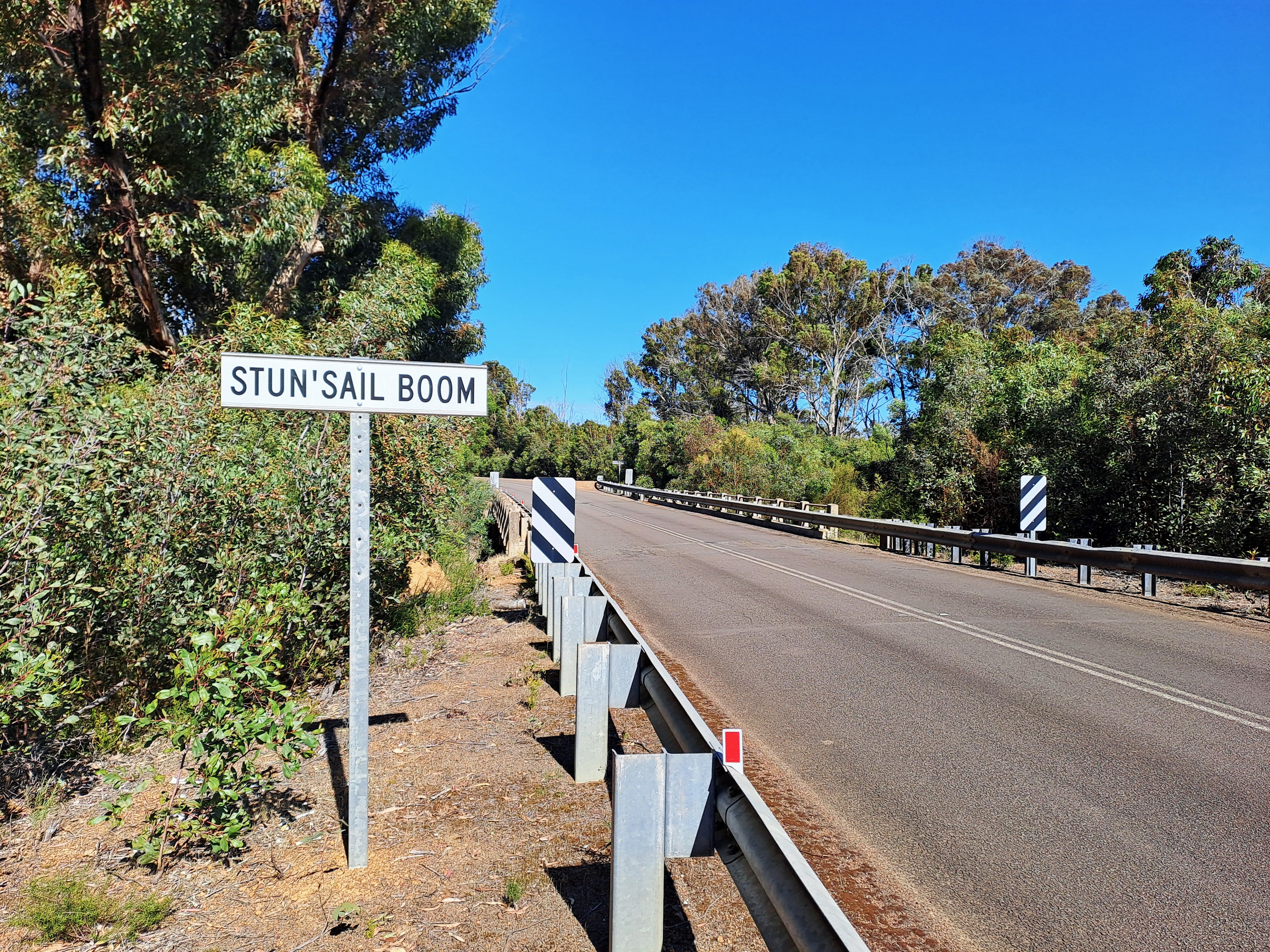
- Bridge over the Stun'sail Boom River in Stun'sail Boom (locality)

- Location of the river mouth in South Australia
- Etymology: Slang for Studding sail

Location
- Country: Australia
- State: South Australia
- Region: Kangaroo Island

Physical characteristics
- Source confluence: North West River and North East River
  - elevation: 22 m (72 ft)
- Mouth: Southern Ocean
  - coordinates: 36°01′15″S 137°00′57″E
  - elevation: 4 m (13 ft)
- Length: 9 km (5.6 mi)
- Basin size: 324 km^{2} (125 sq mi)

The Stun'sail Boom River (or variants Stunsail Boom River and Stuns'l Boom River) is located on the south coast of Kangaroo Island, a large island off the South Australian coast.

== Course and features ==
The river is formed by the confluence of the North West River and North East River, and flows generally south by east through the locality of Stun'sail Boom before reaching the river mouth and emptying in the Southern Ocean. The river descends 18 metres (59 ft) over its 9 kilometres (5.6 mi) course.

== Etymology ==
The river was named after the boom of the stuns'l, sailors slang for studding sail located on the outside of the square rigging of a sailing ship, after Robert Fisher and others found a stun'sail boom at its mouth on 7 November 1836.

== Loss of Montebello ==
The river's name came to some prominence when the French merchant ship Montebello went aground near the Stunsailboom Station in the early hours of Sunday, 18 November 1906. The ship collided with a reef not far from shore. A sailor, Louis Yrebot, swam at great peril with a small line to shore. Increasingly stronger lines followed and a flying fox was established between a large boulder on the shore and the mizzen mast of the stricken ship. All the remaining crew, including a badly injured sailor from an earlier accident, were transferred safely to shore via the flying fox.

Five of the French sailors then made their way through remote and wild countryside and stumbled upon Tilka Hut. Here they were almost immediately found by local lad Percy May, a wallaby trapper, who happened to be passing while delivering a letter to one of the two Tilka sisters, Carlina and Christina, on Stunsailboom Station. The Tilka Sisters looked after the sailors while Percy May made a dramatic 160-kilometre (100 mi) journey on horseback, that required swimming two rivers, to raise the alarm in the town of Kingscote. Several landmarks remain today as evidence of the wreck including the Stunsail Boom River Station shearing shed that is fabricated from original timbers which bear marks of marine origin, notably their rounded edges and bleached appearance; and also remains of the Montebello's steam boiler are wedged between granite rocks on the foreshore at Shelly Beach, the first of several small coves on the inhospitable southern coast to the west of the river mouth.

== Gallery ==
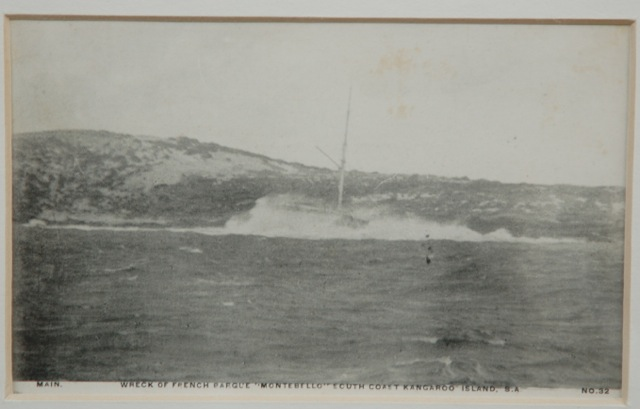

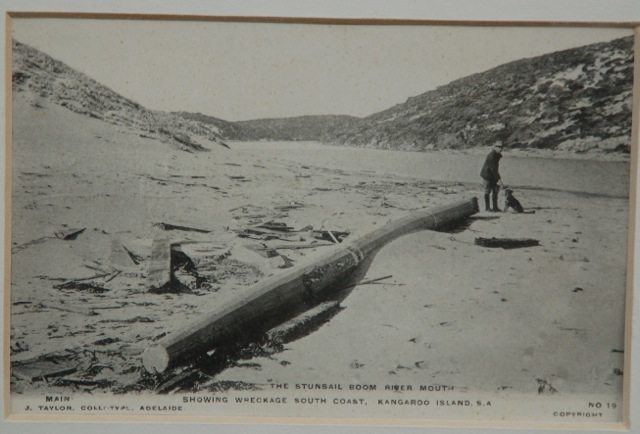

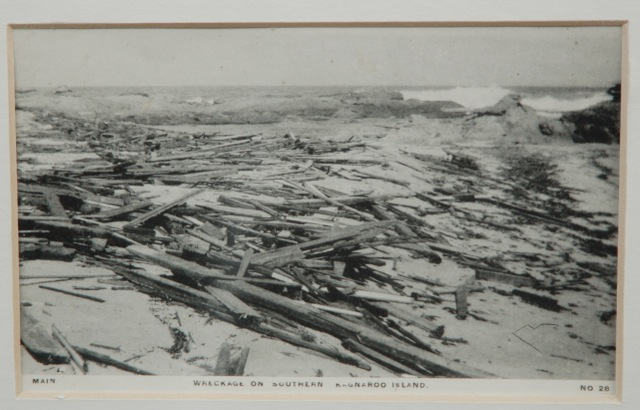

== See also ==
- List of rivers of Australia § South Australia
- List of shipwrecks in 1906
