= George Island (Lake Winnipeg) =

Island in Manitoba, Canada

Coordinates: 52°49′15″N 97°38′27″W

George Island is a small island located within the north basin of Lake Winnipeg in the Canadian province of Manitoba. It lies approximately 400 kilometers (250 mi) north from Winnipeg, and approximately halfway between the community of Grand Rapids on the west shore and the community of Poplar River on the east shore of the lake. A lighthouse named George Island Light is located on the island. To the west of George Island lies Little George Island.

George Island is a popular stop-over because of its natural and sheltered harbour and the pristine sand beaches surrounding the island.

== See also ==
- Reindeer Island
- Hecla Island
- Spider Islands
