= Spider Islands =

Island group in Manitoba, Canada

Coordinates: 53°29′10″N 97°44′14″W

The Spider Islands are a small archipelago in the north basin of Lake Winnipeg in Manitoba, Canada. The archipelago is situated near the eastern shoreline of the lake, north of the mouth of the Belanger River.

The archipelago consists of eight small islands, and together with reefs the islands form a chain that reaches nearly four kilometers or two and a half miles into the north basin.

== See also ==
- Xiyang Island, also known as Spider Island, in Haidao Township, Xiapu, Ningde, Fujian, China
