= SS Ralph Creyke =

SS Ralph Creyke is the name of the following ships, named for Ralph Creyke:

- SS Ralph Creyke (1878)
- SS Ralph Creyke (1879)
