= 1932 Eucharistic Congress =

1932 Catholic event in Dublin, Ireland

31st International Eucharistic Congress
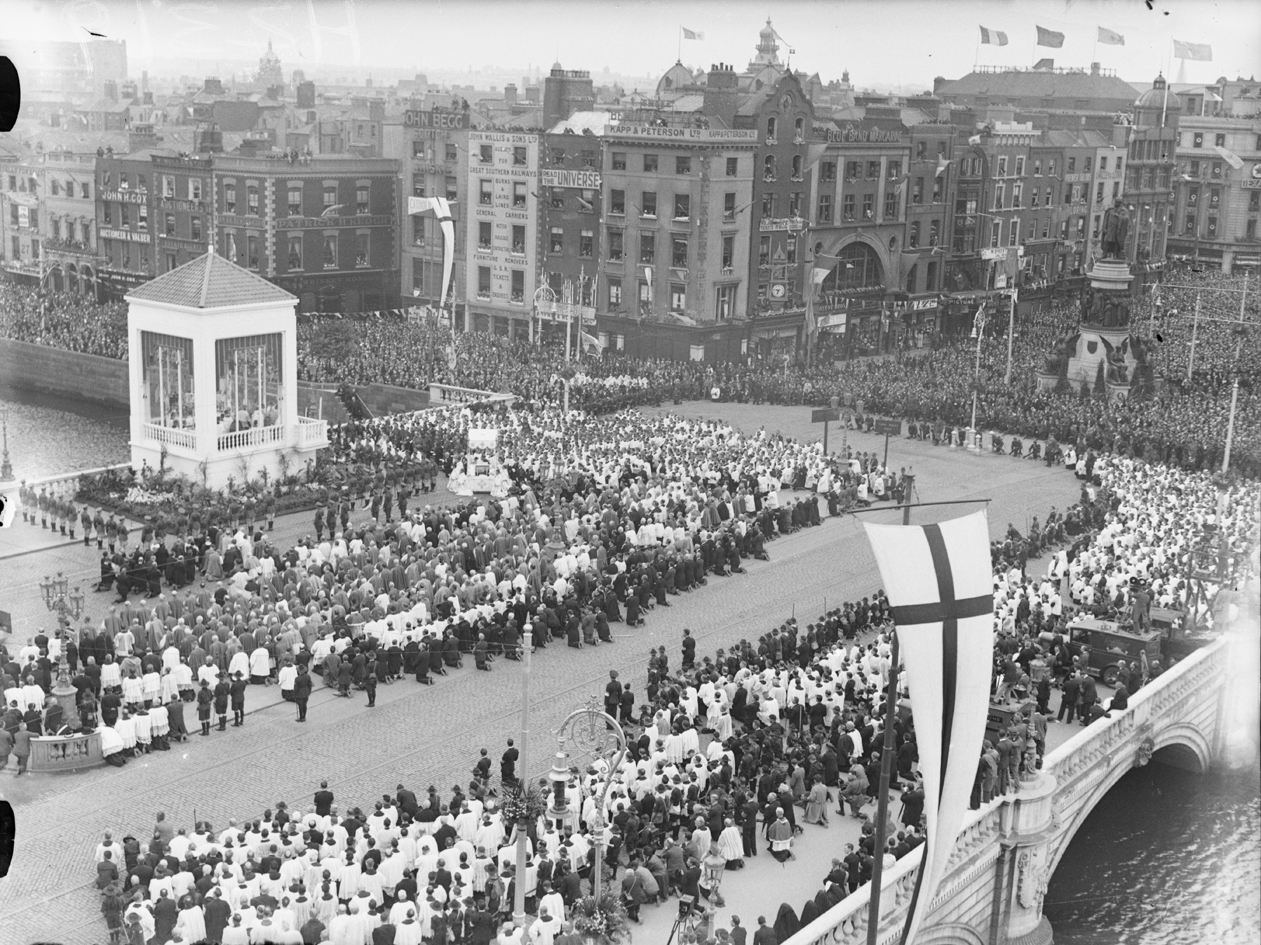
- The closing ceremony of the Eucharistic Congress of Dublin in June 1932
- Date: 22–26 June 1932
- Location: Dublin, County Dublin, Irish Free State
- Type: Eucharistic congress

The 31st International Eucharistic Congress, held in Dublin 22–26 June 1932, was one of the largest eucharistic congresses of the 20th century. Ireland was then home to over three million Catholics, and it was selected to host the congress as 1932 was the 1500th anniversary of Saint Patrick's arrival. The theme was "The Propagation of the Sainted Eucharist by Irish Missionaries".

== Description ==
Two days before, Time magazine noted the Congress' special theme:

Previous Congresses have had their characteristic notes, wrote Managing Editor Vincent de Paul Fitz-patrick of The Catholic Review. In Chicago there was the "enthusiasm of the Americans"; in Rome "the everlasting glory of the church"; in Spain "the love of beauty and gallantry of the Spanish"; in Carthage "the memory of the martyrs." In Dublin, undoubtedly, it would be "the Faith of the Irish."

A flag designed for the Congress that was carried to various ceremonies during the event.

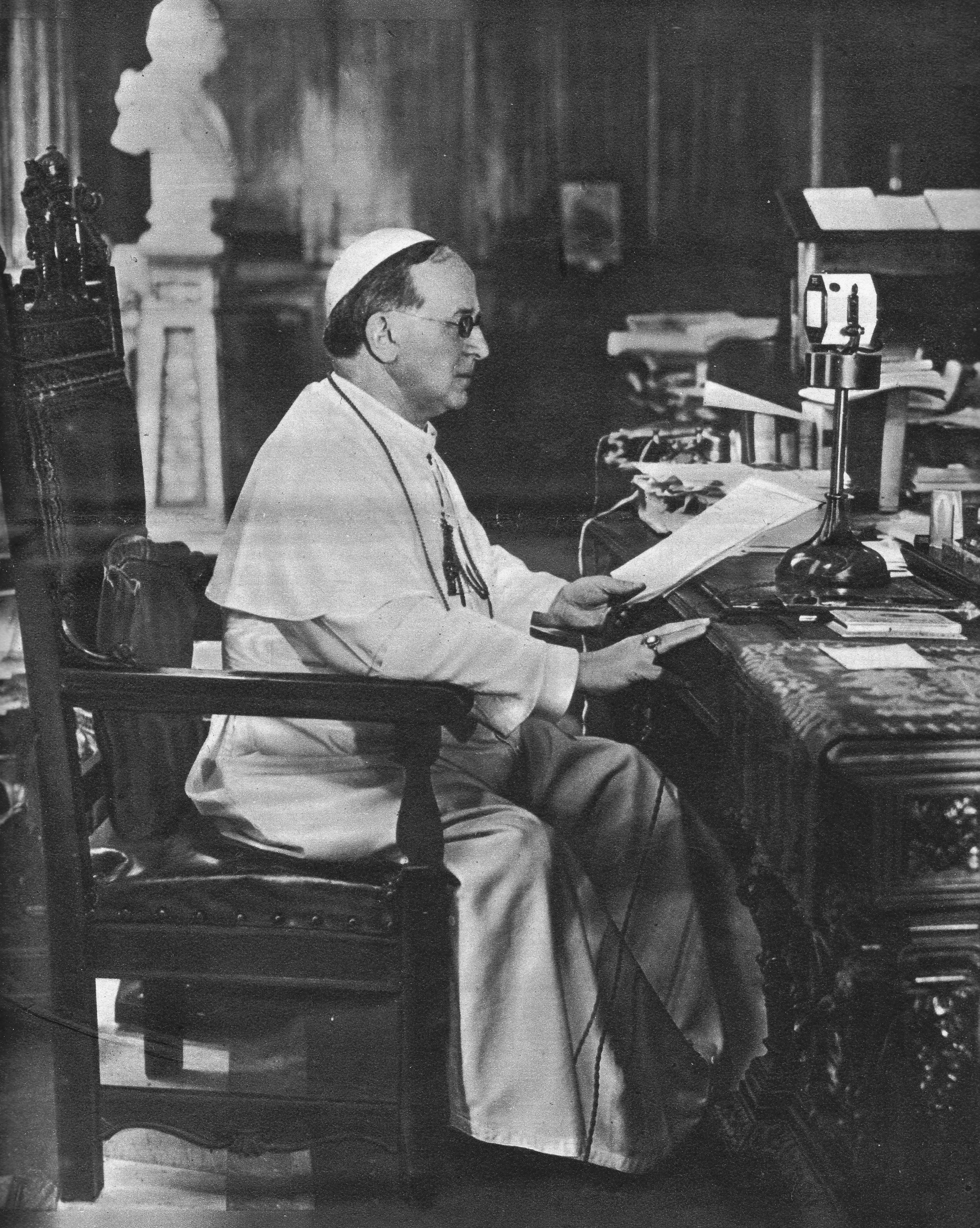
Pope Pius XI giving the message for the International Eucharistic Congress in 1932.

The city of Dublin was decorated with banners, bunting, garlands, and replica round towers. Seven ocean liners moored in the port basins and along Sir John Rogerson's Quay. These were De Grasse, Doric, Dresden, Duchess of Bedford, Marnix van Sint Aldegonde, Rio Bravo and Sierra Cordoba. Five others, Antonia, Laconia, Lapland, Samaria and Saturnia anchored around Scotsmans Bay. The liners acted as floating hotels and could accommodate from 130 to 1,500 people on each. The Blue Hussars, a ceremonial cavalry unit of the Irish Army formed to escort the President of Ireland (from 1938 to 1948) on state occasions first appeared in public as an honour guard for the visiting papal legate representing Pope Pius XI.

John Charles McQuaid, president of Blackrock College, hosted a large garden party on the grounds of the college to welcome the papal legate, where the many hundreds of bishops assembled for the Congress had the opportunity to mingle with a huge gathering of distinguished guests and others who had paid a modest subscription fee.

The final public Mass of the congress was held on 26 June in Phoenix Park at an altar designed by the eminent Irish architect John J. Robinson of Robinson & Keefe Architects, at 1 pm on Sunday, and was celebrated by Michael Joseph Curley, Archbishop of Baltimore. A radio station was set up in Athlone to coincide with the Congress. (Known as Radio Athlone, in 1938, it became Radio Éireann and later RTÉ Radio). The ceremonies included a live radio broadcast by Pope Pius XI from the Vatican. John McCormack, the world famous Irish tenor, sang César Franck's Panis angelicus at the Mass.

Approximately 25% of the population of Ireland attended the Mass and afterwards four processions left the park to O'Connell Street where approximately 500,000 people gathered on O'Connell Bridge and the surrounding streets for the concluding benediction given by the papal legate, Cardinal Lorenzo Lauri. The Dundalk Democrat described the event:

Here men and women are proud to give evidence of their Faith: proud of being sons and daughters of the dead and gone Catholics who kept the flame alive in evil days of persecution and spoliation. ... The men and women of long ago ... from the high place in Heaven won by their heroic piety ... must have looked down upon this glorious scene with serene happiness and benediction.

The English Catholic writer G. K. Chesterton was also present, and observed: "I confess I was myself enough of an outsider to feel flash through my mind, as the illimitable multitude began to melt away towards the gates and roads and bridges, the instantaneous thought 'This is Democracy; and everyone is saying there is no such thing.'"

On the other hand, such an overwhelming display of Catholicity only confirmed to Protestants in the North, the necessity of the border.

== Architecture ==
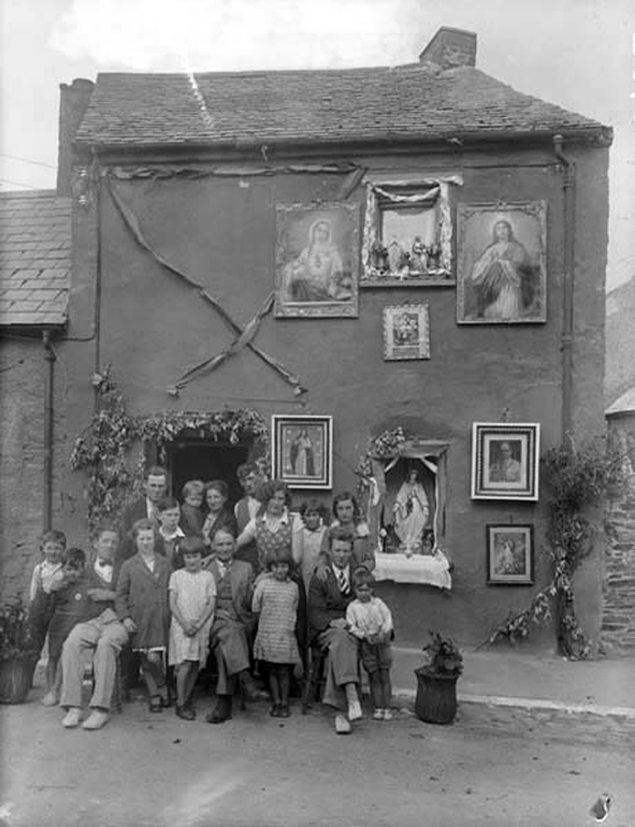
House in Waterford city decorated in honour of the Congress

The architect appointed for the Congress was John J. Robinson who had spent some years in a seminary before he became an architect. The buildings have a Neo-Greek classical theme and consist of:

- Offices for the Congress organisers in Lower Abbey St, Dublin.
- Congress altar on O'Connell Bridge.
- Archway at Blackrock, County Dublin halfway between Dun Laoghaire where the ships arrived from Holyhead and Dublin.
- Congress altar and associated buildings in Phoenix Park.

Many houses around the country were also decorated for the occasion.

== See also ==
- History of Roman Catholicism in Ireland
