= SS Dresden =

A number of steamships have been named Dresden.

- SS Dresden (1884), a cargo ship in service from 1884 to 1925
- SS Dresden (1888), a Norddeutscher Lloyd ocean liner, known for The Dresden Affair
- SS Dresden (1896), a British passenger ship which operated, as such, from 1897 to 1915
- SS Dresden (1914), a Norddeutscher Lloyd ocean liner in service 1927–34

== See also ==
- SMS Dresden
