= List of shipwrecks in 1906 =

List of shipwrecks in 1906 has been divided into:

- List of shipwrecks in 1906 (January–June)
- List of shipwrecks in 1906 (July–December)
