= List of shipwrecks in 1906 (January–June) =

The list of shipwrecks in 1906 (January–June) includes ships sunk, foundered, grounded, or otherwise lost during the first six months of 1906.

table of contents
1906
Jan	Feb	Mar	Apr
May	Jun	Jul	Aug
Sep	Oct	Nov	Dec
Unknown date

== January ==
=== 1 January ===
List of shipwrecks: 1 January 1906
Ship	State	Description
Annie Park	United Kingdom	The 214-ton schooner was wrecked on St. Govan's Head. Her captain and three crewmen died, two others made it to shore.
N.E.T. Co. No. 61	United States	The 197-gross register ton scow sank off Duck Island at the mouth of the Housatonic River on the coast of Connecticut. The only person on board survived.

=== 2 January ===
List of shipwrecks: 2 January 1906
Ship	State	Description
Ailsa	Norway	The 1,146-ton sailing vessel was abandoned off Rockall.
Frank	United States	The 31-gross register ton sidewheel paddle steamer filled with water and sank from unknown causes in the Mississippi River at O'Bryan's Landing or Brien's Landing (sources disagree) near Cairo, Illinois. All three people aboard survived, but she was a total loss.
Genevieve	United States	The steamer sank from an open seam in the Great Kanawha River at Charleston, West Virginia. Raised and recaulked.
Jennie Wand	United States	The 171-gross register ton schooner was stranded on the coast of the Baja California Peninsula 2 miles from La Paz, Mexico. All six people on board survived.
Pepin	Spain	The 1,026-ton cargo ship was wrecked on Scarweather Sands.

=== 3 January ===
List of shipwrecks: 3 January 1906
Ship	State	Description
Gwladys	Canada	The 127-ton sailing vessel was abandoned in the Atlantic Ocean.
Kipling	United Kingdom	The 142-ton sailing vessel was abandoned in the mid-Atlantic Ocean and sank in a gale. The crew were rescued.
Priscilla	United Kingdom	The 141-ton vessel was wrecked on Rocky Point, Torrisdale Bay.
Rowtor	United Kingdom	The 288-foot (88 m), 2,351-ton cargo vessel struck a reef north of the Fratelli Rocks near Bizerta, French Tunisia, in heavy rain and rough seas. She traveled over the reef into deep water where she sank 3/4 mile (1.2 km) west of the rocks.

=== 4 January ===
List of shipwrecks: 4 January 1906
Ship	State	Description
Ariosa	United States	The 140-gross register ton screw steam tug grounded on Romer Shoal, New York, and sank in dense fog in six feet (1.8 m) of water. Wreck removed in 1914. All nine people on board survived.
Caobang	France	The 4,146-ton cargo ship was wrecked at Pulo Kampong.
Carlisle	United Kingdom	The 2,151-ton ship burned in the Saigon River.
Inger	Denmark	The 1,145-ton cargo ship was wrecked at Wheatall Point, near Sunderland.

=== 5 January ===
List of shipwrecks: 5 January 1907
Ship	State	Description
Cordillera	Norway	The 635-ton sailing vessel was abandoned in the Atlantic Ocean.
Webbers Falls	United States	The 26-gross register ton sidewheel paddle steamer sank in the Arkansas River at Webbers Falls, Oklahoma. Both people on board survived.

=== 6 January ===
List of shipwrecks: 6 January 1906
Ship	State	Description
Eva Belle Cain	United States	The tow steamer was sunk in a gale off Salem, New Jersey. Later raised.
Ordovician	United Kingdom	The 1,112-ton cargo vessel was wrecked near Torres Vedras, Portugal.

=== 7 January ===
List of shipwrecks: 7 January 1906
Ship	State	Description
Royal Alfred	United Kingdom	The 151-ton cargo ship sank off Avonmouth.

=== 8 January ===
List of shipwrecks: 8 January 1906
Ship	State	Description
James E. Stansbury	United States	The 51-gross register ton schooner was stranded at Cedar Point, Maryland. All eight people on board survived.
Samuel L. Russell	United States	The 179-gross register ton schooner sank in Chesapeake Bay with the loss of all five people on board.
Scioto	United States	The 84-gross register ton sternwheel paddle steamer either struck a coal flat or collided with an unnamed car float (sources disagree) on the Mississippi River at Vicksburg, Mississippi, and sank in eight feet (2.4 m) of water. All six people on board survived.

=== 9 January ===
List of shipwrecks: 9 January 1906
Ship	State	Description
Richard	Canada	The 148.6-foot (45.3 m), 466-ton steam barge struck a rock, or ran aground, and was wrecked at Blanche Island, Shelburne, Nova Scotia in thick weather.

=== 10 January ===
List of shipwrecks: 10 January 1906
Ship	State	Description
Nicholas Thayer	United States	The 584-gross register ton bark departed Seattle, Washington, bound for Seward, District of Alaska, with 10 people on board and was never heard from again.
Roberta	United States	The steamer was wrecked when she struck a wooden projection of a bridge at Grand Ecore, Louisiana, and sank 500 yards (460 m) below the bridge. A deck hand and a chambermaid were killed.

=== 11 January ===
List of shipwrecks: 11 January 1906
Ship	State	Description
Altona	Canada	The 149-foot (45 m), 691-ton barquentine went aground on Shovelful Shoals, she was pulled off by the tug Gypsum Queen. She sank the next day, 12 January, in the channel east, or 1 1/2 miles (2.4 km) west northwest of Pollock Rip Lightship in about 7 fathoms (42 ft; 13 m) of water.
Cascade	United States	The steamer grounded and sank in the Ohio River below the Union Bridge, Pittsburgh, Pennsylvania. Raised, repaired and returned to service.
Iris	Norway	The 1,382-ton cargo ship was wrecked on Horns Reef, Denmark.
Richard K. Fox	United States	The 47-gross register ton schooner was stranded on the coast of Mexico in the Bay of Campeche. All four people on board survived.
Servia	Norway	The 1,227-ton sailing vessel was abandoned in the Atlantic Ocean.
Shafner Bros.	Canada	The 148-ton vessel stranded on Gull Rocks southwest of Briar Island, Digby, Nova Scotia. She came off and stranded again on Green Island, Tusket Islands, a Total Loss.
W. H. Kruger	United States	The 469-gross register ton screw steamer sank off Point Arena, California. All 16 people on board survived.

=== 12 January ===
List of shipwrecks: 12 January 1906
Ship	State	Description
Cherokee	United States	The steamer ran aground on Brigantine shoal in dense fog. Pulled off by tugs on 13 January.
Itata	United Kingdom	Itata The barque was destroyed by fire at Newcastle, New South Wales, Australia. She later was scuttled in Saltpan Creek, Middle Harbour, Sydney, Australia.
W. H. Kruger	United States	The steamer either foundered at sea off Navarro, California, or ran aground and was wrecked near Greenwood, California, on 11 or 12 January.

=== 13 January ===
List of shipwrecks: 13 January 1906
Ship	State	Description
Orion	United Kingdom	The 1,970-ton vessel was wrecked near Merlimont, France.
Robert H. Stevenson	United States	The 1,290-gross register ton schooner was stranded on Diamond Shoals on the coast of North Carolina with the loss of all 12 people on board.
Unknown	United States	A barge, under the tow of the tug Eugene F. Moran (United States), capsized, and after her towline was cut she sank off the New York City dumping grounds. The only crewman on the barge was lost, and the only crewman on another barge that Eugene F. Moran was towing also was lost somehow.

=== 14 January ===
List of shipwrecks: 14 January 1906
Ship	State	Description
Boringuen	United States	The 15-gross register ton schooner was stranded at Yabucoa, Puerto Rico. All three people on board survived.
Hattie	United States	The 66-gross register ton steam screw ferry burned at dock at Courtwright, Ontario. All four people on board survived, but she was a total loss.
Serbia	Germany	The 2,344-ton cargo ship was wrecked at Nieuwe Diep.

=== 15 January ===
List of shipwrecks: 15 January 1906
Ship	State	Description
Dione	Sweden	The 221-ton vessel was wrecked near Dales Voe Walls.

=== 16 January ===
List of shipwrecks: 16 January 1906
Ship	State	Description
Manhattan	Canada	The 100-ton vessel was wrecked near Canso, Nova Scotia.

=== 17 January ===
List of shipwrecks: 17 January 1906
Ship	State	Description
Atalanta	United States	The 370-gross register ton brig was stranded on "No Man's Land", floated off and drifted onto Seal Island in Penobscot Bay off the coast of Maine. All seven people on board survived.

=== 18 January ===
List of shipwrecks: 18 January 1906
Ship	State	Description
Andrew Axton	United States	The 99-gross register ton sternwheel paddle steamer caught fire in the Monongahela River and was beached at Duquesne, Pennsylvania, where she burned out and became a total loss. All 13 people on board survived.
Cromartyshire	United Kingdom	The 248.8-foot (75.8 m), 1,554-ton sailing ship went aground off Vlissingen, Netherlands. She was refloated, arriving at Middelburg for repairs 12 February, repaired and returned to service 27 March.

=== 19 January ===
List of shipwrecks: 19 January 1906
Ship	State	Description
Horace G. Morse	United States	The 437-gross register ton schooner was stranded on Bliss Island in New Brunswick, with the loss of two lives. There were five survivors.
Vienna	United States	The steamer struck an obstruction in the Tombigbee River at 10 Mile Shoal and sank.

=== 20 January ===
List of shipwrecks: 20 January 1906
Ship	State	Description
Zeta No. 2	United States	The 17-gross register ton motor yacht was stranded in St. Augustine Inlet on the coast of Florida. Both people on board survived.

=== 21 January ===
List of shipwrecks: 21 January 1906
Ship	State	Description
Aquidabã	Brazilian Navy	The Aquidabã-class battleship blew up and sank while anchored off Jacarepaguá, Brazil, after her ammunition magazines exploded. The explosion and sinking killed 212 people. Of her 98 survivors, 36 were injured.
Trojan	United States	The 2,632-gross register ton steel-hulled screw steamer sank after colliding in thick fog with the screw steamer Nacoochie (United States) 3/8 mile (0.60 km) south west the Vineyard Sound Lightship in 15 fathoms (90 ft; 27 m) of water off Vineyard Haven, Massachusetts. wreck partially removed between 6 September and 11 October increasing clearance to 11 fathoms (66 ft; 20 m). Nacoochie rescued all 25 members of her crew.

=== 22 January ===
List of shipwrecks: 22 January 1906
Ship	State	Description
Antoinette	France	The 130-ton sailing vessel was abandoned off Ushant.
Gypsum King	United States	The 562-gross register ton iron-hulled tug was wrecked in thick fog on St. Mary Ledge (part of the Murr Ledges), a reef 3 miles (4.8 km) south-southeast of Southwest Head Light near Grand Manan, New Brunswick, Canada. All 17 people on board survived and rowed to shore in a lifeboat, but she was a total loss. Her wreck settled in 35 feet (11 m) of water 44°28.8′N 066°49.9′W.
Jautris	Russia	The 178-ton cargo ship was sunk in a collision 30 miles (48 km) off Ushant.
Redcap	United Kingdom	The 135-ton fishing vessel was wrecked at Redcap, Orkney Islands.
Rees Lee	United States	The 463-gross register ton sternwheel paddle steamer struck a submerged object in the Mississippi River at Burns Landing near Tiptonville, Tennessee, and sank. All 28 people on board survived, but she was a total loss.
Valencia	United States	SS Valencia With 164 people on board, the 1,598-gross register ton screw passenger steamer was wrecked off Pachena Point, Vancouver Island, British Columbia, in thick weather and heavy seas with the loss of 136 lives — 42 crew and 92 passengers — according to one source and 126 lives according to another. The ship broke up about 36 hours later.

=== 23 January ===
List of shipwrecks: 23 January 1906
Ship	State	Description
Helena	United States	The 28-gross register ton sternwheel paddle steamer was destroyed by an explosion on the Amite River at Whitehall, Louisiana, killing all five people on board.

=== 24 January ===
List of shipwrecks: 24 January 1906
Ship	State	Description
Collingham	United Kingdom	The 2,405-ton cargo vessel was wrecked at Cape Silleiro, Spain.
Genesta	Canada	The 393-ton barquentine was wrecked on Scorpion Reef in the Gulf of Mexico. The crew were rescued by the fishing schooner B. F. Sutter and landed at Pensacola, Florida.
Morning Star	United Kingdom	The 186-ton cargo ship was sunk in a collision 3 miles (4.8 km) from the Newarp Lightship.
Regulator	United States	Regulator The 508-gross register ton sternwheel paddle steamer was destroyed by an explosion and fire while undergoing an overhaul on the ways at St. Johns, Oregon. One source says that all 20 people on board survived, while another says that two crew members were killed.
Stephen Woolsey	United States	The 32-gross register ton schooner was stranded at Montauk Point on the eastern end of Long Island, New York. All seven people on board survived.
Tamagawa Maru	Japan	The 565-ton cargo ship was wrecked in the Spex Straits.
Wern	United Kingdom	The 162-ton cargo ship was sunk in a collision 3 miles (4.8 km) southeast of Point Lynas, United Kingdom.

=== 25 January ===
List of shipwrecks: 25 January 1906
Ship	State	Description
Avenel	United Kingdom	The 271-ton cargo vessel was wrecked outside Thurso harbour, Scotland.
L. Odin	United States	The 19-gross register ton sloop was stranded at Jones Inlet, Long Island, New York. All three people on board survived.
Mariechen	Germany	Disabled and adrift since 25 December 1905, when a deadlight in her coal bunker had sprung open, leaving her without steam power during a voyage from Seattle, Washington, to Vladivostok in the Russian Empire with a crew of 50 and cargo of 5,000 tons of general merchandise on board, the 2,521-gross register ton, 289.6-foot (88.3 m) cargo steamer was wrecked during a snowstorm on a rock in False Bay (57°58′N 134°55′W) in Chatham Strait in the Alexander Archipelago in Southeast Alaska. She was later salvaged.

=== 26 January ===
List of shipwrecks: 26 January 1906
Ship	State	Description
Dixon Rice	Canada	The 196-ton barquentine was wrecked on Riding Rocks, Biminia, Bahamas, a total loss, though some equipment was salvaged.
Lillian	United States	The yacht caught fire at dock at South Portland, Maine, and burned to the waterline and sank. Total loss.
Thyra	Germany	The 991-ton cargo ship was sunk in a collision in the North Sea.
Unknown	United States	The car float, under tow of Defiance (United States), sank two miles (3.2 km) below Brown Buoy.
Willie	United States	With no one on board, the 14-gross register ton sternwheel motor paddle vessel burned on the Ohio River at New Amsterdam, Indiana.

=== 27 January ===
List of shipwrecks: 27 January 1906
Ship	State	Description
Agnes	Australia	The launch sank after a collision in Sydney Harbour.
Elisabetta	Italy	The 390-ton cargo ship was wrecked at Stromboli.

=== 28 January ===
List of shipwrecks: 28 January 1906
Ship	State	Description
Irene	United States	The 491-gross register ton brig was abandoned at sea 25 nautical miles (46 km; 29 mi) southeast of Cape Lookout, North Carolina. All seven people on board survived.
Unknown	United States	A car float, under tow by the tug Transfer No. 9 (United States), was sunk in a collision with Calderon (Belgium) off The Battery, New York City.

=== 29 January ===
List of shipwrecks: 29 January 1906
Ship	State	Description
Charlotte	Russia	The 1,119-ton cargo ship was abandoned 20 miles (32 km) west of Lonstrup, Denmark. The crew survived, but the ship was a total loss.
Telephone	Canada	The 100-ton vessel was wrecked at Cape St. Marys near Cape Race.

=== 30 January ===
List of shipwrecks: 30 January 1906
Ship	State	Description
Kenilworth	United Kingdom	The 327-ton cargo vessel struck a submerged rock and was beached to prevent sinking off Cove, near Aberdeen, a total loss.

=== Unknown date ===
List of shipwrecks: unknown January 1906
Ship	State	Description
Franz	Germany	The 160-ton fishing vessel departed Geestemunde on 2 January and vanished.
Neptun	Denmark	The 784-ton cargo vessel departed Burryport on 30 January and vanished. Debris was found on 5 February by the smacks Challenger and Successor about 65 miles (105 km) southeast of Lowestoft.
Olive	United Kingdom	The 824-ton cargo vessel departed Santander, Spain on 17 January and vanished.
Othello	Chile	The 71.2-metre (234 ft) 1,450-ton full rigged sailing ship departed Caleta Coloso on 8 January and vanished.
Sumus	United Kingdom	The 223-ton cargo vessel departed Middlesbrough on 18 January and vanished. Probably sank in a blizzard during the night of 18–19 January, Her boat and six bodies, out of nine crew, were found in the afternoon of 19 January ashore at Gristhorpe.

== February ==
=== 1 February ===
List of shipwrecks: 1 February 1906
Ship	State	Description
Alma	Norway	The 479-ton vessel was wrecked at Malden Island.
Henry Harley	United States	The steamer was pushed by wind during a gale into the bluff at Buffalo, Tennessee in the Cumberland River breaking a hole in her side causing her to sink in eight feet (2.4 m) of water. Raised and repaired.
Laura	United States	The tow steamer grounded on Burlington Island at low tide. When the tide came back in she listed to port and filled with water. Scheduled to be pumped out.
Ludwig	Germany	The 507-ton cargo ship was wrecked at Harboore.

=== 2 February ===
List of shipwrecks: 2 February 1906
Ship	State	Description
Ariadne	Germany	The 1,671-ton vessel was wrecked off Crestan, Mazatlán, Mexico, in the Gulf of California.
Giuseppina	Italy	The 208-ton vessel was wrecked near Bona.
Yankee Maid	United States	The 58-gross register ton schooner was stranded on Seal Island off the coast of Maine. The only person aboard survived.

=== 3 February ===
List of shipwrecks: 3 February 1906
Ship	State	Description
Fortuna	United States	With no one on board, the 10-gross register ton sloop-rigged yacht was stranded at Ipswich, Massachusetts.
Marshal	United Kingdom	The 1,785-ton vessel was wrecked west of Hook of Holland.
Swansea Castle	United Kingdom	The 160.2-foot (48.8 m) 594-ton barque sank in the South Atlantic Ocean (28°33′S 24°18′W) after springing leaks in heavy weather. The crew were rescued by Alice (France).

=== 4 February ===
List of shipwrecks: 4 February 1906
Ship	State	Description
Bessie Dodd	Canada	The 125-ton vessel was wrecked at St. Shotts, Newfoundland.
Costas	Greece	The 1,329-ton cargo ship was stranded on Petro Island, Tenedos. Refloated and sold for scrap.
Dunbritton	United Kingdom	The 237.5-foot (72.4 m) 1,536-ton barque sank in the North Sea when her tow lines parted in heavy weather having been dismasted earlier.
James Sowders	United States	The 13-gross register ton sternwheel motor paddle vessel was "cut down by ice" on the Ohio River at Leavenworth, Indiana. Both people on board survived.

=== 5 February ===
List of shipwrecks: 5 February 1906
Ship	State	Description
Mobile Bay	United Kingdom	The 1,117-ton cargo vessel burned at Anping, Formosa.
Richard	United States	The 1,338-ton cargo ship was wrecked on St. Andrew's Island.
Starke	United States	The 209-gross register ton schooner was stranded on Chandeleur Island in the Chandeleur Islands on the coast of Louisiana. All six people on board survived.

=== 6 February ===
List of shipwrecks: 6 February 1906
Ship	State	Description
Carey Bros.	United States	The grain boat, under tow by New York Central No. 20 (United States), suddenly sank in the North River off New York City.
David	United States	The 1,337-gross register ton steel-hulled steamer was stranded on San Andrés Island in Costa Rica. All 21 people on board survived.
Domenico Padre	Italy	The 116-ton vessel was wrecked at Licata, Sicily.
Fearless	United Kingdom	The 1,422-ton cargo ship was damaged in a collision at Egremont, Merseyside and was beached, breaking in half. The vessel was later refloated, beached again at Tranmere, Merseyside, and sold.
Febo	Italy	The 2,271-ton cargo ship was wrecked on Cannon Rock, near Cloughey, County Down, Ireland, United Kingdom.
Hindustan	United Kingdom	The 133-ton fishing vessel sank off Conningbeg Lightship, Ireland, United Kingdom.

=== 7 February ===
List of shipwrecks: 7 February 1906
Ship	State	Description
Tris Ichrarchai	Ottoman Empire	The 389-ton vessel was wrecked at Ischia in the Gulf of Naples, about 30 kilometres (19 miles) from Naples.

=== 8 February ===
List of shipwrecks: 8 February 1906
Ship	State	Description
County of Roxburgh	United Kingdom	The 285.5-foot (87.0 m) 2,209-ton barque was wrecked in a cyclone on a coral reef of Takaroa, Tuamotu archipelago, French Polynesia. Ten crewmen died.
Dalles City	United States	The steamer struck a rock in the Columbia River at Curtis Landing, Washington, and was beached in a sinking condition.
Eimeo	France	The 150-ton vessel was wrecked off Tikahau, Paumolee Group.
Thomas J. Owen	United States	The 68-gross register ton schooner burned at Sayreville, New Jersey. All four people aboard survived.

=== 10 February ===
List of shipwrecks: 10 February 1906
Ship	State	Description
Charleston	United States	The 94-gross register ton sternwheel paddle steamer was stranded at Wolf Island Shute in Missouri. All 24 people on board survived.

=== 11 February ===
List of shipwrecks: 11 February 1906
Ship	State	Description
Christal	United States	The 8-gross register ton motor vessel burned at Monhegan Isle in Maine. The only person on board survived.
Joseph Hay	United States	The 188-gross register ton schooner was stranded in the Sow and Pigs Islands off Massachusetts. All five people on board survived.
Veronica	Norway	The 150-ton fishing ship was wrecked 5 miles (8.0 km) east of Lossiemouth, Scotland.
Vigilant	United Kingdom	The 115-ton cargo vessel was wrecked at Covie, 10 miles (16 km) east of Banff.

=== 12 February ===
List of shipwrecks: 12 February 1906
Ship	State	Description
Kiuho Maru	Japan	The 241-ton cargo ship was wrecked at Okushiri, Hokkaido.
Unknown barges	United States	Three barges, under tow of the tug Dauntless (United States), broke loose when seas broke over the tug in a severe storm 35 miles (56 km) south of Cape Canaveral, Florida, and were lost.

=== 13 February ===
List of shipwrecks: 13 February 1906
Ship	State	Description
Darby	Norway	The 883-ton vessel grounded at Yarmouth, Nova Scotia. She was refloated but very leaky and was condemned.
Deer	United States	The steamer went ashore in a gale four miles (6.4 km) south of Au Sable, Michigan.
Easton	United States	The covered barge was struck at dock at the foot of Twenty First Street, New York City, by the steamer Ganoga (United States) after Ganoga's steering jammed in the East River. She was towed by Ganoga to Third Street, where she filled with water.
Feronia	United Kingdom	The 2,966-ton cargo vessel was wrecked in the Salween River at Moulmein, British Burma.
Jennie Lockwood	United States	The 433-gross register ton schooner was stranded on Pea Island on the Outer Banks of North Carolina. All six people on board survived.
Mary E. Pierce	United States	The 21-gross register ton screw steamer was wrecked four nautical miles (7.4 km; 4.6 mi) south of Au Sable, Michigan, when her wheel chains parted. Both people on board survived, but she was a total loss.
Winifred A. Froan	United States	The 858-gross register ton schooner was abandoned at sea off Cape Hatteras, North Carolina. All 14 people on board survived.

=== 14 February ===
List of shipwrecks: 14 February 1906
Ship	State	Description
Southcoates	United Kingdom	The 232-ton fishing vessel was wrecked on the southeast coast of Iceland.

=== 15 February ===
List of shipwrecks: 15 February 1906
Ship	State	Description
Agamemnon	Greece	The 1,096-ton cargo ship was wrecked at Zoungouldak.
Blanche	United States	The 48-gross register ton screw steamer burned at her dock at Hickman, Kentucky. All four people on board survived, but she was a total loss.
Ira D. Sturgis	United States	The 235-gross register ton schooner was stranded on the coast of Delaware near the Indian River. All five people on board survived.
Maine	United States	The laid-up 26-gross register ton sidewheel paddle steamer either was stranded or sank (sources disagree) in the Mississippi River at Albany, Illinois. All four people on board survived.
Scotsman	United Kingdom	The 189-ton cargo ship was lost in the Solway Firth.

=== 16 February ===
List of shipwrecks: 16 February 1906
Ship	State	Description
Abril	Spain	The 1,295-ton cargo ship was wrecked 4 miles (6.4 km) from Clovelly, England.
Dinnington	United Kingdom	The 159-foot (48.5 m), 366-ton cargo vessel was wrecked on the Point of the Pool, Switha, breaking in two in a blinding snowstorm. Two crew died, nine others were rescued by the yawl Jack Reel (United Kingdom).

=== 17 February ===
List of shipwrecks: 17 February 1906
Ship	State	Description
Golden Eagle	United Kingdom	The 224-ton fishing vessel was wrecked near the Hvalsnes Reef, Iceland.

=== 18 February ===
List of shipwrecks: 18 February 1906
Ship	State	Description
Corennie	United Kingdom	The 624-ton cargo ship was damaged in a collision in the Scheldt near Bath, Belgium and was beached, later breaking in half. The ship was declared a total loss.
Württemberg	Germany	The 253-ton fishing vessel was wrecked on the southeast coast of Iceland.

=== 19 February ===
List of shipwrecks: 19 February 1906
Ship	State	Description
L'Avenir	Belgium	The steamer was wrecked two nautical miles (3.7 km) south of Flamborough Head, England.
Tercera	Denmark	The 205.1-foot (62.5 m), 1,063-ton barque was wrecked on a reef off Juan de Nova Island in the Madagascar Channel.
Westphalia	Germany	The 573-ton cargo ship was wrecked at Hanö.

=== 20 February ===
List of shipwrecks: 20 February 1906
Ship	State	Description
Rebecca B. Tennis	United States	The 12-gross register ton sloop was stranded at Newport News, Virginia. The only person on board survived.
Swan	United States	The steamer sprung a leak and sank after being beached on a sandbar in the Savannah River 18 miles (29 km) west of Savannah, Georgia. Raised, repaired and returned to service.

=== 21 February ===
List of shipwrecks: 21 February 1906
Ship	State	Description
Dom Pedro	United States	The 193-gross register ton barge was lost when she struck a dock at New York City. The only person on board survived.
Kernwood	United States	The launch was damaged in a collision off Florida with Ferry Palm Beach (United States) resulting in a 2 1/2-foot (0.76 m) tear in her hull. She was towed to East side Landing where she sank.
Kisshin Maru No. 2	Japan	The 999-ton cargo ship was wrecked at Matoya, Shima Province, Japan.
Phiscardon	Greece	The 347-ton ship burned off Yniada.

=== 22 February ===
List of shipwrecks: 22 February 1906
Ship	State	Description
Corvin Matyas	Austria-Hungary	The 3,093-ton cargo ship was wrecked on Cabezos, Tarifa.
Lady Dora	United States	The 14-gross register ton motor vessel sank in Galveston Bay on the coast of Texas. Both people on board survived.
Maude Cassel	Netherlands	The 3,917-ton, Doxford Turret-class cargo ship stranded on the Arkobadan Reef at Hapinge, Sweden. She later broke in two and was a total loss.
Speke	United Kingdom	The 310-foot (94 m), 2,712-ton sailing ship was wrecked in a gale on rocks on Philip Island, Kitty Miller Bay, Australia. One crewman died.

=== 23 February ===
List of shipwrecks: 23 February 1906
Ship	State	Description
Renner	United Kingdom	The 100-ton vessel was wrecked near High Knock, Buxey.
Valladares	Portugal	The 158-ton cargo ship was sunk in a collision off Portugal.

=== 24 February ===
List of shipwrecks: 24 February 1906
Ship	State	Description
Jehan Ango	France	The 114-ton cargo ship was sunk in a collision off "The Start".

=== 25 February ===
List of shipwrecks: 25 February 1906
Ship	State	Description
Germania	Germany	The 802-ton sailing vessel was abandoned in the Atlantic Ocean.
Latwija	Russia	The 428-ton vessel was wrecked near Ceara, Brazil.
Linnet	United Kingdom	The 127-ton fishing vessel was wrecked at Chalumna, South Africa.
Mary V. Duncan	United States	The 56-gross register ton schooner was lost when she collided with the schooner William and James (United States) in the Chesapeake Bay. All four people on board survived.

=== 26 February ===
List of shipwrecks: 26 February 1906
Ship	State	Description
John Howard	United States	The 32-gross register ton schooner burned at Portsmouth, Virginia. Both people on board survived.
Quadra	Canada	The 174.5-foot (53.2 m), 573-ton lighthouse tender foundered in Nanaimo Harbour, Vancouver Island, British Columbia, Canada. Raised, repaired, and returned to service 1906.

=== 27 February ===
List of shipwrecks: 27 February 1906
Ship	State	Description
Baldwin	Saint Vincent	The 561-ton barquentine caught fire and was beached at St. Vincent, a total loss.
Eliza J. Pendleton	United States	The 672-ton coastal schooner was abandoned 190 miles (310 km) off Fire Island.
Jesse W. Starr	United States	The 307-gross register ton schooner was abandoned in the North Atlantic Ocean off Virginia at 37°37′N 074°36′W. All six people on board perished.

=== 28 February ===
List of shipwrecks: 28 February 1906
Ship	State	Description
Blonde	United Kingdom	The 199-ton cargo ship sank in the North Sea.
Gus Shammel	United States	The 42-gross register ton screw steamer burned in Choctawhatchee Bay, Florida. All three people on board survived.
Number Eleven	United States	The 953-gross register ton schooner barge foundered in heavy seas in a gale off the coast of Maryland 10 nautical miles (19 km) east-southeast of the Fenwick Island Lightship with the loss of all five people on board. The crew of her tow steamer saw four of her crewmen abandon ship in a lifeboat, but they were never seen again.
Thor	Norway	The 299-ton cargo ship was wrecked at Lyngholmen, Norway.

=== Unknown date ===
List of shipwrecks: Unknown February 1906
Ship	State	Description
Albert	Denmark	The 94.5-foot (28.8 m) 125-ton schooner departed Svendborg, Denmark 24 February and vanished.
Buller	United Kingdom	The St Ives pilot boat, with seven pilots on board, capsized, in St Ives Bay, Cornwall, when a schooner hit her, throwing all her occupants into the water. There were no fatalities.
Centennial	United States	The 2,075-gross register ton, 324-foot (98.8 m) iron-hulled screw steamer departed Hakodate, Japan, bound for San Francisco, California, with a crew of 38 aboard on 24 February and was never heard from again. The steamer Pennsylvania (flag unknown) sighted wreckage from Centennial in the North Pacific Ocean in late March 1906. In 1912, Russian explorers found Centennial frozen in the ice and abandoned in the Sea of Okhotsk off Sakhalin Island with no lifeboats aboard and no sign of her crew.
Ferdinand Fischer	Germany	The 235.5-foot (71.8 m), 1,777-ton vessel departed Geelong, Victoria, Australia on 13 February and vanished, possibly in Bass Strait.
Stainburn	United Kingdom	The Workington collier almost wrecked on the Runnelstone, off Gwennap Head, Cornwall, and caught fire. She managed to make her way to Penzance where she was repaired.

== March ==
=== 1 March ===
List of shipwrecks: 1 March 1906
Ship	State	Description
Africa	Italy	The 716-ton vessel was wrecked off Mananzary, Portuguese Madagascar.
Agincourt	United Kingdom	The 4,232-ton cargo vessel was wrecked in the Pelew Islands.
John R. Bergen	United States	The 647-gross register ton schooner was abandoned in the North Atlantic Ocean at 36°12′N 072°30′W. All seven people on board survived.
Willard	United States	The tug sank off Rockport, Massachusetts. Three of five crewmen died.

=== 2 March ===
List of shipwrecks: 2 March 1906
Ship	State	Description
Augustine	United Kingdom	The 1,106-ton cargo vessel was wrecked on Diamenta Rock, off Benghazi, Italian Libya.
Ocean Queen	United Kingdom	The 421-ton steamer was wrecked on rocks called Les Kaines d’Amont, just one-quarter mile (0.40 km) off of Creux Mahie on the south coast of Guernsey (49°25′N 03°39′W) in fog. Some crew in her dinghy made it to shore, others in her lifeboat were rescued by the tug Alert.

=== 3 March ===
List of shipwrecks: 3 March 1906
Ship	State	Description
Lizzie Chadwick	United States	The 472-gross register ton schooner was abandoned off Cape Hatteras, North Carolina. All six people on board survived.
Myndert Starin	United States	With no one on board, the 203-gross register ton barge sank at Weehawken, New Jersey.
Navahoe	United States	The steamer grounded on Middle Bar inside the bar at Cape Fear in a gale with heavy rain. Refloated on 9 March after removal of cargo.

=== 4 March ===
List of shipwrecks: 4 March 1906
Ship	State	Description
Mary Manning	United States	The 1,233-gross register ton schooner was severely damaged and dismasted in a gale and was abandoned after a 110-hour struggle in the North Atlantic Ocean at 39°00′N 68°00′W. All eight people aboard were rescued by Casilda.
Thordis	Norway	The 3,735-ton cargo ship was wrecked at Port Stephens, New South Wales, in heavy weather. She broke up a week later, a total loss.

=== 5 March ===
List of shipwrecks: 5 March 1906
Ship	State	Description
John S. Deering	United States	The 478-gross register ton schooner was abandoned at sea in the North Atlantic Ocean east of Virginia at 37°05′N 071°50′W. Reported still afloat in waterlogged condition as late as July as a hazard to navigation drifting some 3,000 miles (4,800 km) at that time. All seven people on board survived.
Knaresbro	United Kingdom	The 3,101-ton cargo vessel was wrecked at Lemvig, Denmark.
Senior	Germany	The 597-ton cargo ship was wrecked at The Scaw, Denmark.

=== 6 March ===
List of shipwrecks: 6 March 1906
Ship	State	Description
Francesco	Italy	The 748-ton vessel was wrecked at Sapelo.
Hamilton Fish	United States	The 1,616-gross register ton schooner barge or scow barge burned and sank in the North Atlantic Ocean off Barnegat, New Jersey. All three people on board survived.
Millie	Canada	The 639-ton schooner was wrecked off Avery's Rock, Machias Bay near Machias, Maine.
Mokihana	United States	The 15-gross register ton schooner was stranded at "Kahnlula", Maui, Territory of Hawaii. All three people aboard survived.
Senjen	Norway	The 273-ton cargo ship was wrecked at Fiskenes, Andøya, Norway.

=== 9 March ===
List of shipwrecks: 9 March 1906
Ship	State	Description
Jack Osborn	United States	The 125-gross register ton sternwheel paddle steamer burned overnight at dock at New Orleans, Louisiana. All 15 people on board survived, but she was a total loss.

=== 10 March ===
List of shipwrecks: 10 March 1906
Ship	State	Description
Baines Hawkins	Canada	The 189.6-foot (57.8 m), 703-ton cargo vessel was sunk by ice off Port Morien, Nova Scotia.
Chillan	Chile	The 624-ton cargo ship grounded on Maule, Chile. The ship was refloated and beached in sinking condition, a total loss.
Nelson	United Kingdom	The 1,842-ton cargo vessel was stranded on Pierres Vertis and sank in the Fromveur Passage.
Tom Lysle	United States	The tow steamer sprang a leak, rolled over on her side, and sank in the Monongahela River at Braddock, Pennsylvania. While the crew was transferring to the barge Tom Lysle was towing, one female crewmember, a chambermaid, was crushed to death between the vessels. The wreck was abandoned.

=== 11 March ===
List of shipwrecks: 11 March 1906
Ship	State	Description
British King	United Kingdom	The 4,717-ton cargo vessel sank in a gale in the North Atlantic Ocean after springing leaks and cargo shift. Of 47 crew, 8 cattlemen, and 2 stowaways, Mannheim (Germany) rescued 12 and her third officer, Bostonian (United Kingdom) rescued 11 and her captain, plus five others after she sank at (41°40′N 60°11′W). Her captain died two days later from injuries sustained. 28 crew in total died. One of Bostonian's lifeboats was smashed.
Carrie	United States	The tug sank at the Barnes Brothers dock, Port Richmond, New York. The wreck was raised a couple of days later.

=== 12 March ===
List of shipwrecks: 12 March 1906
Ship	State	Description
Ayrshire	United Kingdom	The 133-ton fishing vessel sank in the North Sea.
Colne	United Kingdom	The 875-ton cargo vessel sank in the North Sea after cargo shift off the Dutch coast. The fishing smack Uncle Dick (United Kingdom) rescued six and her captain. 12 others died.
Decima	Germany	The 794-ton cargo ship was wrecked at Hainan.
Gefion	Norway	The 428-ton vessel grounded at Fredriksvaern. She was refloated but sold and was broken up.
Golden Rod	United States	The 132-gross register ton schooner was stranded at Burgeo, Newfoundland. All nine people aboard survived.
Snefrid	Norway	The 399-ton vessel was wrecked near Laesoe in the Kattegat.

=== 13 March ===
List of shipwrecks: 13 March 1906
Ship	State	Description
Alligator	United States	The passenger steamer struck a snag just above Heather Island and sank in five feet (1.5 m) of water. Passengers and crew went to Silver Springs, Florida, in small boats.
Hermann	Germany	The 436-ton barque was abandoned in the North Sea. The crew was rescued by the trawler Poonah.
Hirondelle	France	The 107-ton vessel was wrecked in Thursoe Bay.
Kobold	Germany	The 384-ton cargo ship sank in the Jadeplate.
Olympian	United States	The sidewheel paddle steamer was wrecked at Possession Bay, Chile, while under tow by the steamer Zealandia (United States).
Rigi	Norway	The 499-ton sailing vessel was abandoned off Borkum.
Sidonian	Sweden	The 389-ton vessel was stranded on Laesoe. Refloated, condemned, and sold.

=== 14 March ===
List of shipwrecks: 14 March 1906
Ship	State	Description
Desdemona	United Kingdom	The 242-ton fishing vessel was wrecked on Stokkseyri Reef, east of Reykjanes, Iceland.

=== 15 March ===
List of shipwrecks: 15 March 1906
Ship	State	Description
Tamerlane	Norway	The 898-ton sailing vessel was abandoned off Heligoland.

=== 16 March ===
List of shipwrecks: 16 March 1906
Ship	State	Description
Holland	Netherlands	The 258-ton fishing vessel sank 22 miles (35 km) off Terschelling.
S. E. Davis	United States	The 79-gross register ton schooner was stranded at Clark Island, Maine. All three people on board survived.

=== 17 March ===
List of shipwrecks: 17 March 1906
Ship	State	Description
Sebago	United States	The 307-gross register ton schooner was stranded at Beaver Harbour, New Brunswick. All five people on board survived.
Sovereign	Canada	The 636-ton vessel burned to the waterline and sank at Montreal, Canada. Raised and scrapped.

=== 18 March ===
List of shipwrecks: 18 March 1906
Ship	State	Description
Athen	Germany	The cargo ship was wrecked at Portland Bill, United Kingdom.
Atlanta	United States	The 200.1-foot (61 m), 1,129-gross register ton screw steamer burned on Lake Michigan 14 nautical miles (26 km) south of Sheboygan, Wisconsin. One crewman was killed. The fish tug Tessler (United States) rescued her 39 survivors and towed her to shore, where she burned to the waterline. She was declared a total loss. Her wreck lies 800 feet (244 m) off Cedar Grove, Wisconsin, in 17 feet (5.2 m) of water and is within the boundaries of the Wisconsin Shipwreck Coast National Marine Sanctuary.
Swale	United Kingdom	The 297-ton cargo ship was sunk in a collision off Bexhill.

=== 19 March ===
List of shipwrecks: 19 March 1906
Ship	State	Description
C. C. Lane	United States	The 321-gross register ton schooner was stranded at Boston, Massachusetts. All six people on board survived.
Gordon Rowe	United States	The oyster steamer sank at dock over night at New Haven, Connecticut, due to water not being shut off after filling a tank. One crewman sleeping on board died.
H. C. French	United States	The 142-gross register ton steam canal boat was stranded at New Haven, Connecticut. All four people on board survived.
Lady Antrim	United States	The 87-gross register ton schooner sank off Marblehead, Massachusetts, with the loss of three lives. There was one survivor.
N.E.T. Co. No. 10	United States	The 197-gross register ton scow sank off the breakwater at New Haven, Connecticut. The only person on board survived.
Oak	United States	The 302-gross register ton barge was stranded in the Chesapeake Bay at Thimble Shoal off the coast of Virginia. Both people on board survived.
Violet	United States	The 15-gross register ton sternwheel motor paddle vessel was crushed by ice on the Missouri River at Blencoe, Iowa. The only person on board survived.
Walter J. Schloefer	United States	The 138-gross register ton canal boat was stranded at New Haven, Connecticut. All three people on board survived.

=== 20 March ===
List of shipwrecks: 20 March 1906
Ship	State	Description
Amanda Powell	United States	The tow steamer caught on the dock when the tide came back and she filled with water. She was pumped out.
Martha E. McCabe	United States	The 345-gross register ton schooner barge or scow barge sank at Barnegat, New Jersey. All six people on board survived.
Sainte Marie	Canada	The 148-ton vessel was wrecked at Seaside, Brinker Island.

=== 21 March ===
List of shipwrecks: 21 March 1906
Ship	State	Description
Mary B.	United States	The steamer struck an obstruction in the Mississippi River one-half mile (0.80 km) above Belle Point and sank in three minutes in 80 feet (24 m) of water. Four crewmen killed.
Raymond T. Maull	United States	The 538-gross register ton schooner was stranded on Gull Shoal on the coast of North Carolina. All six people on board survived.
Restituta Madre	Italy	The 567-ton cargo ship sank 50 miles (80 km) from Aboukir.

=== 22 March ===
List of shipwrecks: 22 March 1906
Ship	State	Description
Edith and May	United States	The 128-gross register ton schooner was stranded in the Berry Islands in the Bahamas. All five people on board survived.
Jennie and Florence Cahill	United States	With no one on board, the 168-gross register ton barge sank off Oyster Bay, New York.
Sard	United Kingdom	The 480-ton cargo vessel was wrecked 2 miles (3.2 km) west of Portrush, Ireland, United Kingdom.

=== 24 March ===
List of shipwrecks: 24 March 1906
Ship	State	Description
Rutte	Russia	The 348-ton cargo ship was sunk in a collision off the Isle of Wight.
Unknown car float	United States	A car float, under tow of the tug Harry G. Runkle (United States), filled and sank in the North River off the Pennsylvania Railroad Ferry Dock, Jersey City, New Jersey.

=== 26 March ===
List of shipwrecks: 26 March 1906
Ship	State	Description
Arendal	Norway	The 255-ton vessel was stranded at the entrance to Sunderland. Later refloated and broken up.
Clara E. Uhler	United States	The tug sunk at dock in East Boston, Massachusetts, possibly snagged on the dock when the tide went out. Raised and repaired.
Joseph W. Ross	United States	The tug struck a snag in the lower part of Boston Harbor and was beached on Lovells Island to prevent sinking in deep water. Raised and repaired.
Nannie B	United States	The 85-gross register ton screw steamer was stranded at Bennetts Point, South Carolina. All four people on board survived.

=== 27 March ===
List of shipwrecks: 27 March 1906
Ship	State	Description
Cecilia Hill	United States	The steamer burned at dock at Fish Creek, Wisconsin.

=== 28 March ===
List of shipwrecks: 28 March 1906
Ship	State	Description
Aphrodite	Greece	The 609-ton cargo ship was wrecked at Rettimo, Crete.

=== 29 March ===
List of shipwrecks: 29 March 1906
Ship	State	Description
George T. Hay	United Kingdom	The 1,647-ton sailing ship sank 125 miles (201 km) from Cape St. Francis (36°00′S 25°00′E) in a storm. The crew were rescued by Pestalozzi (Norway).
Montbars	France	The 150-ton cargo ship was sunk in a collision on a voyage between Hennebont and Swansea.

=== 31 March ===
List of shipwrecks: 31 March 1906
Ship	State	Description
Antonio	Italy	The 902-ton vessel was wrecked on Cape Henry.
Mary B	United States	The 84-gross register ton sternwheel paddle steamer sank with the loss of four lives when she struck a log at Belle Point, Louisiana. There were six survivors.
Newsboy	United States	The steamer was damaged/wrecked on the bar at the entrance to Humboldt Bay, California. The tug Ranger (United States) attempted to take her under tow, but was struck by Wasp (United States) and was damaged and had to give up the attempt. Wasp made an unsuccessful attempt at passing a line. The crew abandoned her that evening. She ended up wrecked on the beach.
W. H. Van Name	United States	The 97-gross register ton schooner was lost when she struck the submerged wreck of the barge Oak (United States) in Hampton Roads on the coast of Virginia. All four people aboard survived.

=== Unknown date ===
List of shipwrecks: Unknown date March 1906
Ship	State	Description
Adelene	Canada	The 193-ton sailing vessel was abandoned at sea 60 miles (97 km) east of Highland Light on 18 March.
SMS Albatross	Imperial German Navy	The collier foundered in a storm.
Antonio	United Kingdom	The 174-ton fishing vessel was last seen on 12 March in a severe storm in the North Sea. The vessel probably sank between 12 and 15 March.
Carrie Easler	Canada	The 179-ton sailing vessel was abandoned at sea off Nova Scotia on 18 March.
Chersones	Russia	The 1117-ton vessel left Antwerp on 15 March and vanished.
Jonni	Germany	The 155-ton fishing vessel departed Geestemunde on 11 March and vanished.
Merchiston	United Kingdom	The 1,840-ton cargo ship was sunk in a collision with Eda (United Kingdom) 11 miles (18 km) north northeast of the Spurn Lightvessel off Spurn Head on 31 March or 1 April.
Minister Jansen	Germany	The 106-foot (32 m), 159-ton fishing trawler left Nordenham on 4 March and vanished.
Nicholas Thayer	United States	During a voyage from Seattle, Washington, to Seward, District of Alaska, with a crew of 16 and a cargo of 150 tons of coal, 150 tons of general merchandise, and 425,000 board feet (1,003 m^{3}, 35,400 cu ft) of lumber, the 584-gross register ton, 138.9-foot (42.3 m) bark disappeared with the loss of all hands in the Gulf of Alaska. The discovery by Alaska Natives of wreckage and cargo on Sitkalidak Island in the Kodiak Archipelago led many to believe that she had sunk near Kodiak, although this was well west of her most likely route from Seattle to Seward.

== April ==
=== 1 April ===
List of shipwrecks: 1 April 1906
Ship	State	Description
Minnie	United States	The steamer sank at the Brownell Brothers Lumber Company dock in Berwick, Louisiana, in 35 feet (11 m) of water. Salvage not attempted.

=== 2 April ===
List of shipwrecks: 2 April 1906
Ship	State	Description
Alexander R.	Canada	The cargo schooner was sunk in a collision with Afranmore (flag unknown) off Halifax, Nova Scotia. Total loss, later raised and sold.
Edwardina	Sweden	The 845-ton vessel was wrecked near Nosara, Costa Rica.
Epiros	Greece	The 2,280-ton vessel sank off Crete.
Henry O'Brien	United States	The tug caught fire in Newark Bay and was beached on the flats. The fire was extinguished by the steamer Nanticoke (United States).
Loughrigg Holme	United Kingdom	The 2,069-ton vessel was wrecked at Bari, refloated and later broken up at Palermo.
Sarah E. Easton	United States	The tow steamer sank in a collision with T. L. Sturtevant (United States) in the North River off the Communipaw Coal Dock.

=== 3 April ===
List of shipwrecks: 3 April 1906
Ship	State	Description
Lady Lewis	United Kingdom	The 2,930-ton vessel was wrecked near Motoges Point.
Wyalusing	United States	The 118-foot (36 m), 149-gross register ton steam screw tug was wrecked on Hardings Ledge, a reef off Hull, Massachusetts, and sank in up to 50 feet (15 m) of water at 42°18.315′N 070°50.869′W. All nine people on board survived, but she was a total loss.

=== 6 April ===
List of shipwrecks: 6 April 1906
Ship	State	Description
Denbigh	United Kingdom	The 301-ton vessel capsized and sank while under tow 25 miles (40 kilometres) northeast of Longships, Cornwall.
J. B. Demange	France	The 417-ton vessel was wrecked at the entrance to St. Thomas, Virgin Islands.
Royallieu	United Kingdom	The 205-ton vessel was wrecked 3 1/2 miles (5.6 km) north of Flamborough Head.

=== 7 April ===
List of shipwrecks: 7 April 1906
Ship	State	Description
Cecilia Hill	United States	With no one on board, the 93-gross register ton screw steamer burned at Fish Creek, Wisconsin.
Duncan	Norway	The 1,031-ton vessel stranded at Sherbrooke, Nova Scotia. Refloated and broken up at New York.
Zeta	Unknown British colony	The 144-ton vessel was wrecked at Rodriguez.

=== 8 April ===
List of shipwrecks: 8 April 1906
Ship	State	Description
H. M. Hoxie	United States	The steamer burned and sank after her starboard boiler exploded at Portland, Ohio. Two crewmen were killed in the explosion. She was refloated.
Hounslow	United Kingdom	The 2,902-ton vessel was wrecked near Aserradores.
M. Struve	Germany	The 1,582-ton vessel was wrecked at Foochow.
Robert A. Scott	United States	The towboat sank in a collision with J. H. Williams (United States) in the East River off Pier 8 that caused her to careen to the point she filled with water and sank. One crewman was killed. The survivors were rescued by J. H. Williams.

=== 9 April ===
List of shipwrecks: 9 April 1906
Ship	State	Description
Game Cock	United States	The 59-gross register ton schooner was stranded at Stonington, Maine. All three people on board survived.
Lotna	United States	The 12-gross register ton sloop was stranded at Swampscott, Massachusetts. The only person on board survived.

=== 10 April ===
List of shipwrecks: 10 April 1906
Ship	State	Description
D. Gifford	United States	The 253-gross register ton schooner was stranded at Field Rocks, Massachusetts. All six people on board survived.
Florence	United States	The cargo ship was damaged in a collision with the steamer Captain Bennett (Norway) in the Delaware River, tearing out her stem and causing her crew to beach her on flats off Fort Delaware, Delaware.
Helen F. Ward	United States	The 8-gross register ton schooner was stranded at Provincetown, Massachusetts. The only person on board survived.
Rising Sun	United States	The 80-gross register ton schooner was stranded at Drakes Island, Maine. Both people on board survived.
Sallie B	United States	The 286-gross register ton schooner sank in Casco Bay on the coast of Maine with the loss of four lives. There were two survivors.

=== 11 April ===
List of shipwrecks: 11 April 1906
Ship	State	Description
Bodo	Norway	The 124-ton vessel was wrecked at Kalvik, Sofjord.
Marion	United States	The 235-gross register ton, 123-foot (37.5 m) cod-fishing schooner sank at Sanak Island in the Fox Islands group of the Aleutian Islands. Her crew of eight survived.

=== 12 April ===
List of shipwrecks: 12 April 1906
Ship	State	Description
Georgette	France	The 612-ton vessel was sunk in a collision in the River Humber.
Lyn	Argentina	The 102.7-foot (31.3 m) 153-ton fishing schooner sank in Moltke Bay, Royal Bay, South Georgia Island.

=== 13 April ===
List of shipwrecks: 213 April 1906
Ship	State	Description
Nettie Cushing	United States	The 117-gross register ton schooner was stranded on Cornfield Sand Shoal on the coast of Connecticut. All four people on board survived.
Norwegia	Norway	The 581-ton sailing vessel was abandoned in the Atlantic off the Blaskets, County Kerry, Ireland, U.K..
Sirene	France	The 103-ton vessel was wrecked on Iceland.

=== 14 April ===
List of shipwrecks: 14 April 1906
Ship	State	Description
Bouquet	United States	The barge, under tow by Hokendauqua (United States), sank in Block Island Sound five miles (8.0 km) east of Watch Hill, Rhode Island, about three miles (4.8 km) offshore.

=== 15 April ===
List of shipwrecks: 15 April 1906
Ship	State	Description
"Louisiana"	United States	The excursion steamer struck a snag at Newburg, Indiana. She was run ashore, but sank, a Total Loss.

=== 16 April ===
List of shipwrecks: 16 April 1906
Ship	State	Description
Eugene Zimmerman	United States	The steamer was sunk in a collision with Saxona (United States) in the St. Marys River.

=== 17 April ===
List of shipwrecks: 17 April 1906
Ship	State	Description
Angelo Padre	Italy	The 320.2-foot (97.6 m), 3,214-ton cargo vessel was damaged by an explosion and sank at La Corunna, Spain. The vessel was declared a constructive total loss. The wreck was raised, taken to Genoa and broken up.
G. L. Daboll	United States	The 49-gross register ton schooner was stranded at Egmont Key, Florida. All five people aboard survived.
HM Torpedo Boat 84	Royal Navy	The TB 82-class torpedo boat sank in the Mediterranean Sea after colliding with the destroyer HMS Ardent (Royal Navy.

=== 18 April ===
List of shipwrecks: 18 April 1906
Ship	State	Description
City of Detroit	United States	The 118-gross register ton steam canal boat was destroyed by fire at the Baltimore and Ohio Railroad Dock in St. George, Staten Island, New York. All four people on board survived.
Columbia	United States	San Francisco earthquake: The Steamer capsized at the Union Iron Works dock while being refit, puncturing her hull and sinking. Raised, repaired and returned to service by January 1907.
Ella L. Slaymaker	United States	The 34-gross register ton schooner burned on the Delaware River. Both people on board survived.

=== 19 April ===
List of shipwrecks: 19 April 1906
Ship	State	Description
Comte de Smet de Naeyer	Belgium	The 267-foot (81 m) 1,863-ton full-rigged training ship was found to be leaking on 17 April and two days later water ingress became uncontrollable and she sank in the Bay of Biscay in about 47°12′N 04°30′W. Of the 24 crew and 30 cadets on board, 10 and 18 respectively were drowned. She was on a voyage from Antwerp for Port Natal, southern Africa, with cement. One lifeboat with 14 crew and 12 cadets was picked up by the French ship Dunkerque.
Kazan	Russia	The 5,472-ton vessel was wrecked on Nilkete Rock 2 miles (3.2 km) southwest of Panadura, Ceylon.

=== 20 April ===
List of shipwrecks: 20 April 1906
Ship	State	Description
Afrika	Ottoman Empire	The 1,240-ton vessel was sunk in a collision off Kefken, Euxine.
Louise Hastings	United States	The 123-gross register ton schooner sank at Havana, Cuba. All three people on board survived.
"Repell"	United States	The launch burned to the waterline at Port Huron, Michigan.

=== 22 April ===
List of shipwrecks: 22 April 1906
Ship	State	Description
Nannie B.	United States	The steamer sank while tied up at dock at Bennetts Point. One crewman possibly died.

=== 23 April ===
List of shipwrecks: 23 April 1906
Ship	State	Description
Mary F. Pike	United States	The 125-gross register ton schooner was stranded on East Point on Prince Edward Island. All four people aboard survived.
Norumbega	United States	The 126-gross register ton schooner was lost when she collided with the schooner Edith L. Allen (United States) off Fenwick Island on the coast of Maryland. All 17 people aboard survived.
Stella	Sweden	The 171-ton vessel was sunk by ice near Grund Kollen.

=== 24 April ===
List of shipwrecks: 24 April 1906
Ship	State	Description
Anne	Denmark	The 87.9-foot (26.8 m) 132-ton schooner foundered near Marwick Head, Orkney.
Anglo Peruvian	United Kingdom	The steamer struck an iceberg on 21 April in the North Atlantic Ocean and sank on 24 April. Her entire crew was rescued by Mohawk (United Kingdom).
St. Peter	Canada	The 551-ton schooner was wrecked at Calhouns Point, New Brunswick.

=== 25 April ===
List of shipwrecks: 25 April 1906
Ship	State	Description
Chu Kong	British Hong Kong	The 134.8-foot (41.1 m) 490-ton ferry sank near Swatow.
Mary Anne	United States	The canal boat sank after the steamer Lansing (United States) struck her, causing her to fill and sink at Philadelphia, Pennsylvania.

=== 26 April ===
List of shipwrecks: 26 April 1906
Ship	State	Description
Bentong	Straits Settlements	The cargo ship was sunk in a collision with Haversham Grange (United Kingdom) off Cape Rachado, Malaya in the Malacca Strait. Survivors were rescued by Haversham Grange and Tosa Maru (Japan).
Havana	Canada	The salvage vessel was sunk in a collision with Strathcona (Canada) off Halifax, Nova Scotia.
Shiloh	United States	The steamer struck a snag between Washington, North Carolina, and Tarboro, North Carolina, and was beached off Indian Creek.

=== 27 April ===
List of shipwrecks: 27 April 1906
Ship	State	Description
Gudrun	Denmark	The 108-ton vessel was wrecked at Stokkseyri, Iceland.
Henriette	France	The 119-ton fishing vessel was wrecked at Reykjavík Roads.

=== 28 April ===
List of shipwrecks: 28 April 1906
Ship	State	Description
Audacieuse	France	The 145-ton vessel was abandoned in the Atlantic 25 miles east of Cape Broyle.
Idria	Sweden	The 211-ton vessel grounded and condemned at Hide, Slite, Gotland.
William F. Campbell	United States	The 211-gross register ton schooner sank in Penobscot Bay off Owls Head, Maine. All five people aboard survived.

=== 29 April ===
List of shipwrecks: 29 April 1906
Ship	State	Description
River Hunter	New Zealand	The 145.25-foot (44.27 m) 284-ton barkentine was wrecked while under tow at the entrance to Whangapē Harbour, New Zealand.

=== 30 April ===
List of shipwrecks: 30 April 1906
Ship	State	Description
Brenda	United Kingdom	The 1,995-ton vessel burned at Valparaíso, Chile and was beached in sinking condition, a total Loss.
Courier II	United Kingdom	The steamer struck Les Anons, a rock south of Jethou. There were 29 survivors and 10 deaths. The ship was salvaged on 1 August 1906 and returned to service after repairs.
Maria Josefa	Uruguay	The 116-ton vessel was wrecked on the breakwater at Barcelona.

=== Unknown date ===
List of shipwrecks: Unknown date April 1906
Ship	State	Description
Adeline	United States	The 15-gross register ton screw steamer sank at Whealton, Virginia. All three people on board survived.
Æolus	Norway	The 137-ton vessel departed Haugesund on 10 April and vanished.
Merchiston	United Kingdom	The 1,840-ton cargo ship was sunk in a collision with Eda (United Kingdom) 11 miles (18 km) north north east of the Spurn Lightvessel off Spurn Head on 31 March or 1 April.
Nictheroy	Brazil	The 267.4-foot (81.5 m), 1,516-ton passenger/cargo ship was wrecked near Belem sometime in April.

== May ==
=== 1 May ===
List of shipwrecks: 1 May 1906
Ship	State	Description
Blanefield	United Kingdom	The 3,411-ton cargo ship was sunk in a collision with the barque Kate Thomas (United Kingdom) 3.6 miles (5.8 km) south of Beachy Head (50°40′N 0°14′W). Twelve crew were rescued, but one died afterwards. Five others were reported missing.

=== 2 May ===
List of shipwrecks: 2 May 1906
Ship	State	Description
Alaska	United States	The 60-gross register ton, 73.7-foot (22.5 m) iron-hulled screw steamer was destroyed by fire while in winter quarters at St. Michael, District of Alaska. All eight people aboard survived.
Jessie B.	United States	The steamer capsized in a windstorm and broke in two at Fairview, Illinois. A total loss.
Preston	United Kingdom	The 2,099-ton vessel was wrecked at Point Bay, near Camarinas, Spain.

=== 3 May ===
List of shipwrecks: 3 May 1906
Ship	State	Description
Explorer	United States	With no one on board, the 15-gross register ton, 50-foot (15.2 m) sternwheel paddle steamer sank in the Yukon River at Russian Mission, District of Alaska.

=== 5 May ===
List of shipwrecks: 5 May 1906
Ship	State	Description
Float No. 33	United States	The car float was sunk when struck in thick fog by the ferry Somerville (United States) off Pier L, Jersey City, New Jersey.
Red Wing	United States	The tow steamer sank at dock at the Nelson & Son Mill in Boggy Creek, Nassau River, Florida when her rail hung up on the guard of a lighter. Later raised.

=== 6 May ===
List of shipwrecks: 6 May 1906
Ship	State	Description
Levy Bros.	United States	The 24-gross register ton schooner barge or scow barge sank in Lake Pontchartrain in Louisiana. All three people on board survived.
Rock Island	United States	The 533-gross register ton, 134-foot (40.8 m) sternwheel paddle steamer was crushed by ice and sank at a wharf in the Tanana River at Chena, District of Alaska. All 30 people on board survived. Repeated attempts to refloat her failed.
Rosa	Norway	The 281-ton vessel was wrecked 10 miles from Rio Grande do Sul.

=== 7 May ===
List of shipwrecks: 7 May 1906
Ship	State	Description
Alice	United States	The 61-gross register ton schooner was stranded at Chincoteague Cove on the coast of Virginia. All four people on board survived.
Eagle Point	United States	The steamer struck a snag and sank at Cassville, Wisconsin, in the Mississippi River in seven feet (2.1 m) of water. Later raised.

=== 8 May ===
List of shipwrecks: 8 May 1906
Ship	State	Description
M. I. Wilcox	United States	The 377-gross register ton schooner was stranded at Colchester Point on the coast of Ontario. All five people on board survived.
Vandalia	United States	The 41-gross register ton schooner sank in the Gulf of Mexico off Cape Romano on the coast of Florida with the loss of all four people aboard.

=== 9 May ===
List of shipwrecks: 9 May 1906
Ship	State	Description
Algeria	United States	The 2,038-gross register ton schooner sank off Cleveland, Ohio, with the loss of one or two lives. There were 10 survivors. Wreck removed in November.
Armenia	United States	The 2,040-gross register ton schooner barge or scow barge, under tow by Pabst (United States), sank in a storm on Lake Erie four miles (6.4 km) off the lighthouse at Pelee Island, Ontario (41°57′N 82°58′W) in seven fathoms (42 ft; 13 m) of water. All seven people on board rescued by Pabst. Later the wreck was blown up with dynamite and dispersed by tugs with grapple hooks.
Erbrin	Norway	The 576-ton vessel was wrecked at Caicos.
Horn Point	United States	The 12-gross register ton sloop sank in East Lynnhaven Inlet on the coast of Virginia. All three people on board survived.

=== 10 May ===
List of shipwrecks: 10 May 1906
Ship	State	Description
Tanana Chief	United States	The 72-gross register ton, 59.2-foot (18.0 m) sternwheel paddle steamer was wrecked on the Kantishna River in the District of Alaska. All eight people on board survived.

=== 11 May ===
List of shipwrecks: 11 May 1906
Ship	State	Description
Europa	Russia	The 984-ton vessel was wrecked at Skvattan.
Mystery	Barbados	The 162-ton schooner was wrecked at Cape Pine.
Vigilant	United States	The steamer ran aground and sank in the vicinity of Thessalon, Ontario, in the Canadian Channel.

=== 12 May ===
List of shipwrecks: 12 May 1906
Ship	State	Description
Blue Stone	United States	The tug sank at the Communipaw Coal Dock in Jersey City, New Jersey, when the wake of the United States Government steamer Scout (United States) washed across her deck, causing her to heel over and flood. She was raised by nightfall and towed to a drydock and found to be undamaged.
Dream	United States	The 12-gross register ton schooner was stranded at Savannah, Georgia. All four people on board survived.
Sardinero	Spain	The 2,096-ton vessel struck a submerged object in fog and sank 4 miles (6.4 km) east of Wolf Rock, Cornwall, England (50°01′N 05°41′W). The crew were rescued by Golden Rule (United Kingdom).
Shokaku Maru	Japan	The 285-ton vessel was wrecked near Port Kushiro, Hokkaido, Japan.

=== 13 May ===
List of shipwrecks: 13 May 1906
Ship	State	Description
Hattie G. Dixon	United States	The 528-gross register ton barkentine was stranded on Chappaquiddick Island on the coast of Massachusetts. All eight people on board survived.

=== 14 May ===
List of shipwrecks: 14 May 1906
Ship	State	Description
Olga	United States	The 444-ton vessel was wrecked on Molokai, Hawaii Territory.

=== 15 May ===
List of shipwrecks: 15 May 1906
Ship	State	Description
Selkirk	United States	The 223-gross register ton sternwheel paddle steamer was wrecked in the Rock Island Rapids on the Columbia River near Rock Island, Washington. All nine people on board survived.
Teresina Mignano	Italy	The 607-ton vessel was sunk in a collision in the Gironde estuary.

=== 16 May ===
List of shipwrecks: 16 May 1906
Ship	State	Description
Baltimore	United States	The ferry was damaged when struck by the lighter Greenwich (United States) in the North River off Desbrosses Street in New York City, punching a hole in her hull. She made it to her Desbrosses Street slip and unloaded her passengers and cargo before sinking.

=== 17 May ===
List of shipwrecks: 17 May 1906
Ship	State	Description
Ivanhoe	Queensland	The labor schooner was wrecked on a reef at Altar Cove, Malaita Island, British Protectorate of the Solomon Islands.
HM Torpedo Boat 56	Royal Navy	The TB26-class torpedo boat foundered in the Mediterranean Sea off Damietta, Egypt, while under tow by the cruiser HMS Arrogant (Royal Navy).

=== 18 May ===
List of shipwrecks: 18 May 1906
Ship	State	Description
Nord	Sweden	The 2,330-ton vessel was wrecked near Nexo, Bornholm, Denmark.
Thealka	United States	The steamer struck an obstruction and sank in the Big Sandy River at Red House, Kentucky.
Unknown barge	United States	The coal barge, under tow of the tug Alice (United States), was sunk when she was sucked into the propeller of Langfond (flag unknown) off Twenty-Seventh street, Brooklyn.

=== 19 May ===
List of shipwrecks: 19 May 1906
Ship	State	Description
Eugenie	Norway	The 656-ton vessel was wrecked near Stockholm. Refloated, taken to Stockholm and condemned..
Fortuna	Falkland Islands	The 164-ton schooner was wrecked on a reef off the north end of West Falkland, Falkland Islands in a gale, a Total loss. Crew and passengers rescued by schooner "Lafonia".
Waldemar	Sweden	The 111-ton vessel was wrecked on the east coast of Oland.

=== 20 May ===
List of shipwrecks: 20 May 1906
Ship	State	Description
Cassard	France	The 85.1-metre (279 ft) 2,289-ton A type Chantiere de La Loire class Barque was wrecked on Bleaker Island, Falkland Islands in fog in a gale .
Jupiter	Sweden	The 292-ton vessel was wrecked at Visby, Sweden.
Koyukuk	United States	During a voyage with 32 people aboard, the 280- or 286-gross register ton (sources disagree), 120.5-foot (36.7 m) sternwheel paddle steamer struck a rock and was wrecked at the mouth of the Little Delta River on the Tanana River below Chena, District of Alaska. All on board survived. She may have been salvaged.

=== 21 May ===
List of shipwrecks: 21 May 1906
Ship	State	Description
Golden Gate	United Kingdom	The 899-ton vessel was wrecked 5 miles north of Port Desire, Argentina.
Manau	United Kingdom	The 2,745-ton vessel was wrecked 7 miles (11 km) north of Bahia.
Oakburn	United Kingdom	The 3,865-ton vessel was wrecked at Duiker Point, South Africa. Two crew were killed.

=== 22 May ===
List of shipwrecks: 22 May 1906
Ship	State	Description
Lotta Talbot	United States	The 342-gross register ton, 145.7-foot (44.4 m) sternwheel paddle steamer was wrecked at Fairbanks, District of Alaska. Her crew of five survived.
Thistle	United States	The steamer sank at dock at Juneau, District of Alaska. Raised, machinery salvaged, and was broken up.
Trio	Norway	The 870-ton sailing vessel was abandoned in the Atlantic.

=== 23 May ===
List of shipwrecks: 23 May 1906
Ship	State	Description
John H. Crook	United States	The 100-gross register ton canal boat was stranded in Quebec. The only person on board survived.
Lucia Vittorio	Italy	The 554-ton vessel was wrecked 16 miles (26 km) from Vladivostok.
William J. Sewell	United States	When the steamer attempted to pass between the disabled steamer Pennsylvania (United States) and another tow off Portsmouth, Virginia, she struck Pennsylvania and had to be beached.

=== 24 May ===
List of shipwrecks: 24 May 1906
Ship	State	Description
City of Concord	United States	The steamer sank at dock in Cleveland, Ohio, after springing a leak in Lake Erie. She was raised.
Hugin	Norway	The 1,332-ton vessel sank after striking a rock in the Sarmiento Channel.
Thomas Tryon	United States	The canal boat sank at the mouth of Glen Cove Creek in the harbor of Hempstead, New York, Long Island. The wreck was removed in December 1906.

=== 25 May ===
List of shipwrecks: 25 May 1906
Ship	State	Description
Gustavus A. Müller	United States	The 21-gross register ton sloop was stranded at Tucker's Beach, New Jersey. Both people on board survived.
Olga	United States	The 498-gross register ton schooner was stranded on Kahoolawe in the Hawaiian Islands. All 12 people on board survived.

=== 26 May ===
List of shipwrecks: 26 May 1906
Ship	State	Description
Badger	United Kingdom	The 200-ton fishing vessel was wrecked at Bow Aikerness, Westray.
Carrick	United Kingdom	The 186-foot (57 m), 577-ton cargo passenger ship was sunk in a collision with Duke of Gordon (United Kingdom) in dense fog (55°06′N 05°10′W). Two crewmen jumped aboard Duke of Gordon at time of the collision. The rest of the survivors were rescued by Mastiff. Her captain, a cabin boy, and four passengers died.
Dixie	United States	The 12-gross register ton sternwheel motor paddle vessel sank in the Tennessee River at Johnsonville, Tennessee. All 12 people on board survived.
John Eggers	United States	The 25-gross register ton schooner was stranded at Wind Point, Wisconsin. The only person on board survived.
Katherine M	United States	With no one on board, the 191-gross register ton barge burned at Hastings, Minnesota.
Peter Berg	Denmark	The 1,833-ton vessel was wrecked at Dunnet Head, Scotland.
Queen of Cambia	United Kingdom	The 834-ton vessel was wrecked at Vivero, Spain.
Ribble	United Kingdom	The 115.5-foot (35.2 m), 182-ton steam trawler ran over a rock ledge in fog at Clohane Island near Mizen Head, County Cork, Ireland, United Kingdom into water surrounded by rocks. The next day an attempt was made to back her out and she struck amidships. She had sunk by the time a tug arrived on 29 May, a Total Loss.

=== 27 May ===
List of shipwrecks: 27 May 1906
Ship	State	Description
Canadian	Canada	The 108-ton schooner was abandoned in the Atlantic on a voyage from Cadiz, Spain to St. John's, Newfoundland.
Gem	United Kingdom	The 180-ton vessel was sunk in a collision off the Coquet.
Lismore	United Kingdom	The 255-foot (78 m), 1,676-ton sailing ship was wrecked on Easterly Point, Santa Maria Island, Chile in heavy weather, breaking in two, a total loss. Four people survived the sinking while her master and 12 crew were killed.

=== 28 May ===
List of shipwrecks: 28 May 1906
Ship	State	Description
Invicta	United Kingdom	The 178-ton vessel was towed while burning into Felixstowe where she sank. The wreck was later blown up.
Mable Wilson	United States	The 1,224-gross register ton schooner sank off Cleveland, Ohio, with the loss of one life. There were seven survivors.
Trio	Norway	The 308-ton vessel grounded on Oregrund and was condemned.

=== 29 May ===
List of shipwrecks: 29 May 1906
Ship	State	Description
Antofagasta	Chile	The 1,016-ton vessel was wrecked at Valparaiso, Chile.
James A. Stetson	United States	The 65-gross register ton schooner was stranded on Amherst in the Magdalen Islands in the Gulf of Saint Lawrence. All four people on board survived.
Leros	Germany	The steamer was en route from Newcastle to Lisbon with a cargo of Singer sewing machines when she ran aground in thick fog on Tasse de la Frette Rocks, northwest of Burhou near Alderney, Channel Islands.

=== 30 May ===
List of shipwrecks: 30 May 1906
Ship	State	Description
G. B. Lockhart	Canada	The 120-foot (37 m) 305-ton brig was wrecked on Bonaire and broke up in high seas. Her Master and his wife died. Their 4 year old son and the rest of the crew survived.
HMS Montagu	Royal Navy	HMS Montagu aground on Lundy Island The Duncan-class battleship was wrecked on Lundy Island in thick fog. After her guns and other equipment was salvaged, Salvage was abandoned in 1907 and the ship was scrapped in situ.
Palestine	United Kingdom	The trawler was damaged in a collision with Westmoor (United Kingdom) off the "Smalls". Her captain tried to make it to port but she sank 3 1/2 hours later. The crew were rescued by the yacht Lorna (United Kingdom).

=== 31 May ===
List of shipwrecks: 31 May 1906
Ship	State	Description
Erin	Canada	The steamer sank after colliding with the steamer John B. Cowle (United States) off St. Clair, Michigan in the St Clair River. Five crew, including two women, were killed.
Gwendoline	United Kingdom	The 724-ton vessel was sunk in a collision in the North Sea.
Knias Gortschacow	Russia	The 3,287-ton transport was sunk by a naval mine 25 miles (40 km) off Vladivostok, Russia.
Loire Inferieure	United Kingdom	The 180-ton vessel was sunk in a collision off Trafalgar.
Maggie A. Phillips	United States	The 95-gross register ton schooner departed Baltimore, Maryland, bound for Gregorytown in the Bahamas with six people on board and was never heard from again.

=== Unknown date ===
List of shipwrecks: Unknown date May 1906
Ship	State	Description
E. and G. W. Hinds	United States	The 115-gross register ton schooner was stranded at Plympton, Nova Scotia. All four people on board survived.
Pitcairn Island	United Kingdom	The 1,320-ton vessel burned before 17 May in the Pacific Ocean west of Chile (52°00′S 90°00′W).

== June ==
=== 1 June ===
List of shipwrecks: 1 June 1906
Ship	State	Description
Brookhill	United States	The ferry sank at dock in a windstorm at Baton Rouge, Louisiana.
Diana	Germany	The 138-ton fishing vessel was sunk in a collision on the River Elbe.
Three Sisters	United States	The 33-gross register ton schooner was lost when she collided with an unidentified barge in Hampton Roads on the coast of Virginia. All three people on board survived.

=== 2 June ===
List of shipwrecks: 2 June 1906
Ship	State	Description
Clara E. Rogers	United States	The 144-gross register ton schooner was lost off Vineyard Haven Light on the coast of Massachusetts after colliding with an unidentified screw steamer. All four people on board survived.
Quickstep	United States	The 66-gross register ton sternwheel paddle steamer capsized and burned in a windstorm at Lake Des Allemands, Louisiana. All 15 people on board survived, but she was a total loss.

=== 3 June ===
List of shipwrecks: 3 June 1906
Ship	State	Description
Aristide Marie Anne	France	The 115-ton fishing vessel was abandoned 10 miles off the north coast of Iceland.
Cornwall	United Kingdom	The 181-ton vessel was wrecked on Cavallos de Fas, near Esposende, Portugal.
Geromina	Italy	The 102-ton vessel sank 10 miles southwest of Punta Falcone, near Asanaru Island.
Magdeleine	France	The 208-ton fishing vessel was wrecked in St. Mary's Sound, Scilly Islands.
Mary	United States	The 174-gross register ton screw steamer burned at dock at either Ogdensburg or Waddington, New York (sources disagree). All 25 people on board survived.
Unknown barge	United States	The barge, under tow by T. J. Wood (United States), sank as a result of a collision between T. J. Wood and the tug Harry A. Laughlin (United States) at Vesta Mine No. 4 in the Monongahela River.

=== 4 June ===
List of shipwrecks: 4 June 1906
Ship	State	Description
Bulgaria	United States	The 1,888-gross register ton screw steamer was wrecked in heavy fog on Fisherman Shoal in Lake Michigan. All 15 people on board survived, but she was a total loss.

=== 5 June ===
List of shipwrecks: 5 June 1906
Ship	State	Description
General Roberts	United Kingdom	The 142-ton fishing vessel sank 12 miles (19 km) northeast of Round Island, Scilly Islands.
Volunteer	United States	The 585-gross register ton schooner was stranded on the coast of California near Bodega Head with the loss of three of the 10 people aboard.
Yorkshire	United Kingdom	The 1,306-ton vessel was wrecked on Leman Sands.

=== 6 June ===
List of shipwrecks: 6 June 1906
Ship	State	Description
Dunbeth	United Kingdom	The 4,000-ton water tanker was wrecked in a storm at Robert's Harbor, Lüderitzbucht, German South West Africa. Declared a Total Loss, she was refloated, repaired and returned to service 3 years later.
Otto Wathne	Norway	The 547-ton vessel was wrecked at Siglefjord, Iceland.

=== 7 June ===
List of shipwrecks: 7 June 1906
Ship	State	Description
Adelaide	France	The 223-ton vessel sank off Cape Prior.
Dreadnot	United States	The 9-gross register ton sloop was lost when she struck a submerged wharf off Charleston, South Carolina. The only person on board survived.
Grecian	United States	The cargo steamer, a steel bulk carrier, struck a rock in the St. Marys River off De Tour Village, Michigan, and sank in shallow water. She later was refloated, but sank again on 15 June.
Park Bluff	United States	The steamer struck a sunken log and sank at Stillwater, Minnesota. Her boiler and machinery were salvaged and used in another steamer.

=== 8 June ===
List of shipwrecks: 8 June 1906
Ship	State	Description
Lillie	United States	The 53-gross register ton screw steamer was destroyed by fire while docked overnight at Southport, North Carolina. All eight people on board survived.

=== 9 June ===
List of shipwrecks: 9 June 1906
Ship	State	Description
Lulu	United States	The 13-gross register ton motor paddle vessel sank off Pitts Point, Kentucky. All three people on board survived.

=== 10 June ===
List of shipwrecks: 10 June 1906
Ship	State	Description
Emma L. Cottingham	United States	The 522-gross register ton schooner sank in the Gulf of Mexico at (26°58′N 085°10′W) with the loss of five lives. There were three survivors.
Etolia	United Kingdom	The cargo ship was wrecked off Cape Sable Island, Nova Scotia. Her crew survived.
Miami	United States	The 81.77-gross register ton, 71.6-foot (21.8 m) steam screw tug was wrecked on a sand bar in the District of Alaska about 14 miles (23 km) above the mouth of the Kvichak River when she grounded on a falling tide. The next rising tide twisted off her keel and she sank. Her entire crew of seven survived, but she was declared a total loss.

=== 11 June ===
List of shipwrecks: 11 June 1906
Ship	State	Description
Corinthian	United States	The 94-gross register ton motor schooner was swamped and wrecked on the bar at the entrance to Humboldt Bay, California, eventually drifting on to the beach alongside the wreck of Newsboy (United States). All but two crewmen were saved by the United States Life Saving Service.
Fearless	United States	The steamer sank at Colee, Florida two and a half miles (4.0 km) from Picolata, Florida, on the St. Johns River. Later raised.
Unknown barge	United States	The barge, under the tow of the tug R. S. Carter (United States), was sunk in a collision with another barge, also under tow, off Pier 24 in the North River. Later towed to the Jersey Flats. It is unclear if still filled or was refloated at the time.

=== 12 June ===
List of shipwrecks: 12 June 1906
Ship	State	Description
Withlacoochee No. 9	United States	The 119-gross register ton barge sank in port at Inglis, Florida. The only person on board survived.

=== 13 June ===
List of shipwrecks: 13 June 1906
Ship	State	Description
Argus	United States	The 566-gross register ton motor vessel burned near Destruction Island off the coast of Washington. All 14 people aboard survived.
Essex	United States	A scow caught fire at the Savannah Wharf in the harbor of Baltimore, Maryland, setting the steamer on fire. She drifted across the harbor, filled with water, and grounded on the south side of the harbor. Was raised by July, not as damaged as first thought.
Meuse	Belgium	The 794-ton vessel was sunk in a collision off Haaks Lightship.
Vauban	France	The 1,735-ton vessel was wrecked at Bonavista.

=== 14 June ===
List of shipwrecks: 14 June 1906
Ship	State	Description
Corriere	Italy	The 1,575-ton stranded on Ship Island, Mississippi. Refloated, taken to Mobile, Alabama, condemned and sold.
Jennie Sweeney	United States	The 643-gross register ton schooner sank off the coast of North Carolina near the Cape Fear Bar. All eight people on board survived.
Rose	United States	The barge was damaged when struck by Pennoil (Germany) in the Delaware River causing her to be beached off the mouth of the Christiana River.

=== 15 June ===
List of shipwrecks: 15 June 1906
Ship	State	Description
Grecian	United States	After sinking in the St. Marys River in Michigan on 7 June and being refloated, the 2,348-gross register ton steel-hulled steam cargo ship, a bulk carrier, was under tow to Detroit, Michigan, by the cargo ship Sir Henry Bessemer (United States) for repairs when she foundered in Lake Huron four nautical miles (7.4 km; 4.6 mi) south of Thunder Bay on the coast of Michigan. All 20 people on board survived. Her wreck lies in 100 feet (30 m) of water at (44.968611°N 83.200833°W).
Nordstern	Germany	The 261-ton fishing vessel was wrecked on Iceland.
Orion	United Kingdom	The 150-ton fishing vessel sank in the North Sea.
Toyotomi Maru	Japan	The 1,456-ton transport was sunk by a naval mine off Myongchkyon, Korea.

=== 16 June ===
List of shipwrecks: 16 June 1906
Ship	State	Description
Mignonne	France	The 102-ton vessel sank 10 miles east of Seydisfjord.

=== 17 June ===
List of shipwrecks: 17 June 1906
Ship	State	Description
Carrie A. Ryerson	United States	The steamer was almost cut in two in a collision with Georgia (United States) on Lake Michigan. Her passengers were taken off and she tried to beach, sinking in 12 feet (3.7 m) of water. Raised 5 July, repaired and returned to service.
Drepano	Italy	The 1,558-ton vessel was wrecked at Takura, 42 miles (68 km) east of Benghazi, Ottoman Tripolitania.
Edith L. Allen	United States	The 969-gross register ton schooner sank in the North Atlantic Ocean off Florida at (26°10′N 079°38′W). All nine people on board survived.
Steel King	United States	The steamer sank in shallow water near Harbor Beach, Michigan. Raised, repaired, and returned to service.

=== 18 June ===
List of shipwrecks: 18 June 1906
Ship	State	Description
Ares	Sweden	The 70.1-metre (230 ft) 1,151-ton vessel was sunk in a collision with Hilversum (Netherlands) in the North Sea in 33-metre (108 ft) of water.
Carrie A. Ryerson	United States	The steamer was damaged in a collision with Georgia (United States) at the mouth of White Lake Harbor. She proceeded into the harbor where she sank.
Hiddie Feore	United Kingdom	The 341-ton vessel was wrecked at Bacurano.
Silva Americano	Portugal	The 179-ton vessel was wrecked at the entrance to the Kwanza River, Portuguese Angola.

=== 19 June ===
List of shipwrecks: 19 June 1906
Ship	State	Description
Napoleon	United States	The 43-gross register ton screw steamer was sunk by a floating object while docked at the foot of Walnut Street in New Orleans, Louisiana. The only person on board survived.
Portland	United States	The 493-gross register ton barkentine was stranded in the harbor at San Pedro, California. All 10 people on board survived.

=== 20 June ===
List of shipwrecks: 20 June 1906
Ship	State	Description
Bertha	Denmark	The 240-ton schooner, or barkentine, was sunk in a collision off South Goodwin or South Sand Head.
Empress	United Kingdom	The 484-ton vessel was sunk in a collision in the Irish Channel.

=== 23 June ===
List of shipwrecks: 23 June 1906
Ship	State	Description
F. T. Barry	United Kingdom	The 839-ton vessel was damaged in a collision, and was beached at Gunfleet Sands to prevent sinking, but was a total loss.

=== 25 June ===
List of shipwrecks: 25 June 1906
Ship	State	Description
Argentina	Unknown British colony	The 583-ton barquentine was abandoned in the South Atlantic off Brazil at 28°00′S 46°00′W.
Ashford	United Kingdom	The 2,812-ton vessel was sunk in a collision 8 miles (13 kilometres) west southwest of Beachy Head.
Robert Holland	United States	The steamer listed and sank at Duluth, Minnesota, when lumber was stacked too high causing her to list enough to fill with water.
Tirreno	Italy	The 2,812-ton vessel was damaged in a collision with "St. Andrews" in the Straits of Gibraltar and beached. She was refloated and broken up at La Spezia.

=== 27 June ===
List of shipwrecks: 27 June 1906
Ship	State	Description
Alfred W.	United States	The tug struck a rock in dense fog, slid off and sank between Duluth, Minnesota, and Port Arthur, Ontario. Later raised.
Walkyrie	France	The 138-ton fishing vessel was wrecked at Langenes, Iceland.

=== 28 June ===
List of shipwrecks: 28 June 1906
Ship	State	Description
Carrier	United Kingdom	The 346-ton vessel was wrecked on Southeast Tow Rock, off St. Govan's Head.
E. C. Hay	United States	The 63-gross register ton schooner was lost when she collided with the passenger screw steamer C. F. Tietgen (Denmark) in the North River off the Desbrosses Street Ferry terminal in New York City. All four people on board survived.
Lillie	Unknown British colony	The 311-ton vessel was wrecked on Grand Cayman Island.

=== 29 June ===
List of shipwrecks: 29 June 1906
Ship	State	Description
Dolphin	United Kingdom	The 115-ton vessel was wrecked in the Pacific Ocean on the breakwater at Salina Cruz, Mexico.
Swansea	United States	The steamer struck a submerged object between Duluth, Minnesota, and Superior, Wisconsin, and started leaking. She sank in shallow water. Later raised.

=== 30 June ===
List of shipwrecks: 30 June 1906
Ship	State	Description
Argus	United States	The 526-ton vessel was abandoned on fire 35 miles off Destruction Island, later towed while still burning into Neah Bay, Washington, a Total Loss.
Claire	France	The 192-ton vessel was sunk in a collision off Miquelon.
Henrietta	United States	The 62-gross register ton sternwheel paddle steamer burned in Bayou Felix in Louisiana. All 10 people on board survived.
Hinode Maru	Japan	The 1,115-ton vessel was sunk in a collision near Sasebo.
Josephine Lincoln	United States	The tow steamer sank at dock at Philadelphia, Pennsylvania over night. Raised at 4 p.m. that day.
New Orleans	United States	The 1,457-gross register ton screw steamer, a wooden bulk carrier, sank after colliding in fog with the screw steamer William R. Lynn (United States) in Thunder Bay on the coast of Michigan 4 nautical miles (7.4 km; 4.6 mi) below Middle Island and north of Thunder Bay Island. Her wreck lies in 145 feet (44 m) of water at 45.16755°N 83.217383°W. William R. Lynn rescued all 16 people on board.
Nivelle	United Kingdom	The 2,241-ton vessel was wrecked at Point Grande, off Antofagasta, Chile.

=== Unknown date ===
List of shipwrecks: unknown June 1906
Ship	State	Description
Elna	Denmark	The 120-ton schooner was abandoned prior to 11 June in the Atlantic on a voyage from Cadiz, Spain to Robert Bay.

== Unknown date ==
List of shipwrecks: Unknown date 1906
Ship	State	Description
Alfred W.	United States	The tug struck a rock and sank off Pie Island in 60 feet (18 m) of water in either January, June or July. Raised, repaired and returned to service.
Annie	United States	The 15-gross register ton schooner was stranded at Brunswick, Georgia. Both people on board survived.
Anominos	Ottoman Empire	The 372-ton vessel was wrecked at Brindisi sometime in 1906.
Aztec	United States	With no one on board, the 22-gross register ton motor paddle vessel was stranded in the Colorado River in the Arizona Territory.
Bergen	Norway	The lifeboat was lost during a rescue operation off Stave, Andøya.
Carita	United States	The vessel was lost in the Inside Passage in Tongass Narrows in the Alexander Archipelago in Southeast Alaska near Ketchikan, District of Alaska.
Catherine	United States	With no one aboard, the 12-gross register ton sloop-rigged yacht sank in the Christiana River in Delaware.
Colombia	Norway	The 1,202-ton vessel departed Wallaroo, Australia on 26 January for Falmouth and vanished.
C. Paulsen	Germany	The 701-ton barque departed Cuxhaven, Germany on 31 January and vanished.
Eridan	France	The 927-ton vessel was lost sometime in 1906.
Gracie	United States	With no one on board, the 40-gross register ton schooner was stranded on the Savannah River in Georgia.
Harvest Home	United States	The 78-gross register ton schooner was lost when she collided with an unidentified British vessel off Cape Cod, Massachusetts. All three people on board survived.
Helvecia II	Argentina	The small cargo carrying tugboat departed San Carlos de Bariloche sometime in 1906 and vanished on Lake Nahuel Huapi. Wreck located in 2024.
Ina Mactavish	United Kingdom	The 65-foot (20 m) 80-ton coastal lighter sank. She was refloated, lengthened to 77 ft (23 m), repaired, and returned to service.
Jorgen Bang	Norway	The 675-ton vessel departed Surabaya, Netherlands East Indies on 22 March for Delagoa Bay, Portuguese Mozambique. Last seen in the Bali Strait on 28 March and vanished.
Oregon	United States	The steamer sunk sometime in 1906 in the Menominee River at Milwaukee, Wisconsin. She was refloated in mid 1907.
Polly	United States	The steam tug sank in the Yukon River.
Rodenbek	Germany	The 1,602-ton brigantine departed Liverpool on 23 January for Australia and vanished after being spoken to on 12 February at 13°N 27°W.
Sandbeck	United Kingdom	The 293-ton vessel sank in the River Niger sometime in 1906.
Sorata	Norway	The 733-ton vessel departed Apia, Samoa on 25 January for Marseille and vanished.
Stetson and Ellison	United States	The 56-gross register ton schooner sank in Delaware Bay. All four people on board survived.
Theodor	Norway	The 2,311-ton vessel sailed from Port Tampa, Florida for Yokohama, Japan on 2 March and vanished.
West Side	United States	The United States Department of Commerce and Labor publication Thirty-Ninth Annual List of Merchant Vessels of the United States for the Year Ending 30 June 1907, reported that the 324-gross register ton schooner was stranded in Georgian Bay near Parry Sound, Ontario, Canada, on an unidentified date. All six people on board survived.
