= Goole Steam Shipping Company =

Late 19th Century passenger vessel service

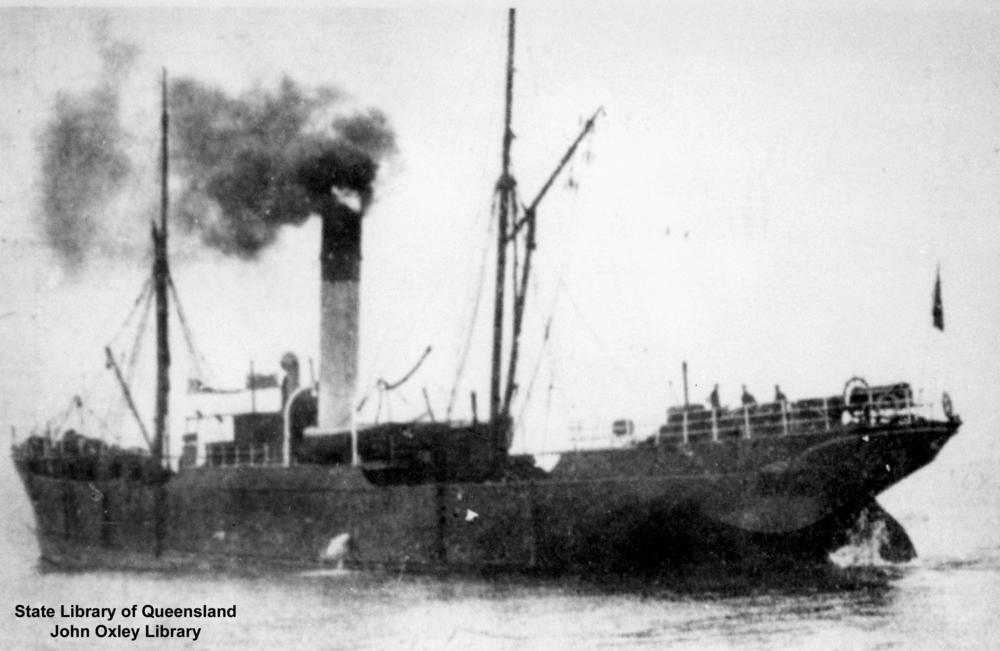
The 698 GRT cargo steamship Aire, built in 1886 by William Dobson & Company of Newcastle. She was and scrapped at Hook near Goole in 1930

Goole Steam Shipping Company house flag

The Goole Steam Shipping Company was a company based in Goole, England from 1864 to 1905 which operated steamship services from Goole to northern European ports.

== Career ==
The Goole Steam Shipping Company was established in 1864 to take over the failed business of Watson, Cunliffe and Company, who had been operating a regular steam boat service from Goole to West Continental Ports.

It was established with capital of £100,000 (equivalent to $12,420,000 in 2023) with the object of continuing the several Trades already existing between the Port of Goole and Antwerp, Rotterdam, Ghent and Dunkirk, and to extend them not only to those Ports, but to other places.... The directors were:

- Walter Spencer Stanhope Esq, JP, Cannon Hall, Barnsley (Trustee of the Aire and Calder Navigation Company)
- George Anderton Esq JP, Cleckheaton (Managing Director of the Lancashire and Yorkshire Railway)
- John Wells Esq JP, Eastoft Hall, near Goole
- Richard Moxon Esq JP, Pontefract (Director of the Leeds and County Bank Limited)
- John Banks, jun., Esq., Howden Hall, near Goole, (Timber Merchant)
- George Herring Esq., Maitland House, Kensington
- Captain John Moody, Goole and London, Shipowner (also Managing Director)

The company had the distinctive funnel-colouring of dark buff with red bank and black top.

In 1895 the company took over two other shipping concerns, the Humber Steam Shipping Company which owned 3 vessels, and the Yorkshire Coal and Steamship Company which owned 11 vessels.

In 1905 the company was acquired by the Lancashire and Yorkshire Railway and all 19 of its steamers transferred to the new owner.

== Ships operated by the Goole Steam Shipping Company ==
Ships ordered new by the Goole Steam Shipping Company

- Killarney
- Colletis
- Londos
- Deva
- Annie
- Walter Stanhope
- Victoria
- William Coulman
- John Wells
- Richard Moxon
- Romeo
- Lord Houghton
- Seaham
- Wynyard
- Ralph Creyke (1878)
- Ralph Creyke (1879)
- Ouse
- Aire
- Calder
- Derwent
- Wharfe
- Hebble
- Don
- Nidd
- Humber
- Colne

Ships acquired from the Humber Steam Shipping Company in 1895

- Rosa
- Norma
- Leona

Ships acquired from the Yorkshire Coal and Steamship Company in 1895

- Dinnington
- River Crake
- Cuxhaven
- Dresden
- Wenning
- Frankfort
- Gotha
- River Ribble
