= SS Derwent (1888) =

History

United Kingdom
- Name: SS Derwent
- Operator: 1888–1905: Goole Steam Shipping Company; 1905–1922: Lancashire and Yorkshire Railway; 1922–1923: London and North Western Railway; 1923–1931: London, Midland and Scottish Railway
- Port of registry: Goole
- Builder: William Dobson and Co, Walker Yard
- Yard number: 24
- Launched: 12 June 1888
- Completed: 1888
- Out of service: 1931
- Fate: Scrapped 1931

General characteristics
- Tonnage: 830 gross register tons (GRT)
- Length: 230 feet (70 m)
- Beam: 30.7 feet (9.4 m)
- Draught: 14.7 feet (4.5 m)
- Propulsion: 1 x screw, T3cyl (19, 33.5 & 54 x 33ins), 185nhp

SS Derwent was a passenger and cargo ship built for the Goole Steam Shipping Company in 1888.

== History ==
The ship was built by William Dobson and Company in Walker Yard for the Goole Steam Shipping Company and launched on 12 June 1888. The engines were manufactured by the Wallsend Slipway and Engineering Company, and she was constructed under the supervision of Mr Sisson, the inspecting engineer for the Goole Company.

On 19 September 1898 she was hit by her sister ship Dresden which was inward bound to Goole.

In 1905 she was acquired by the Lancashire and Yorkshire Railway.

In October 1908 she was in collision with the British brigantine Enterprise of Folkestone, and caused her to sink. All hands on the Enterprise bar one were lost.

On 28 August 1912 she was anchored midstream in Goole waiting to enter the lock, when a strong southerly wind caused her to sheer into her sister ship Ralph Creyke which was outbound with a full cargo of coal. Derwent’s anchor chain became caught in Ralph Creyke’s propeller and her engines were stopped. The accident required Ralph Creyke to be drydocked to remove the chain.

In 1922, Derwent was acquired by the London and North Western Railway and one year later by the London, Midland and Scottish Railway. She was scrapped in 1931 by T Young in Sunderland.
