= SS Hebble =

British freighter

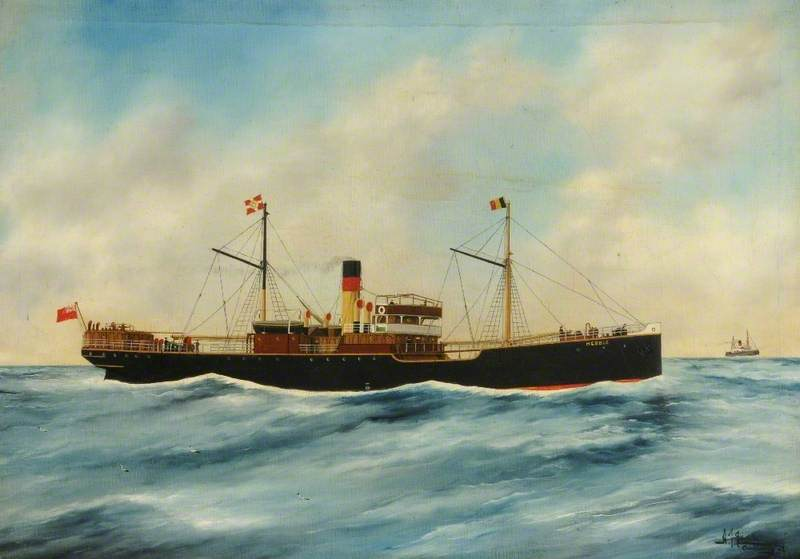
- The Hebble, by A. J. Jansen

History

United Kingdom
- Name: SS Hebble
- Operator: 1891–1905: Goole Steam Shipping Company Limited; 1905–1917: Lancashire and Yorkshire Railway
- Builder: William Dobson and Company, Walker Yard
- Yard number: 47
- Launched: 7 Jul 1891
- Completed: 24 Aug 1891
- Fate: Sunk 6 May 1917

General characteristics
- Tonnage: 904 gross register tons (GRT)
- Length: 225 feet (69 m)
- Beam: 31.6 feet (9.6 m)
- Draught: 15.5 feet (4.7 m)

SS Hebble was a freight vessel built for the Goole Steam Shipping Company Limited in 1891.

== History ==
Hebble was built by William Dobson and Company in Walker Yard for the Goole Steam Shipping Company Limited and launched on 7 July 1891.

Hebble was obtained by the Lancashire and Yorkshire Railway in 1905.

On 12 August 1908, Hebble was damaged in a collision with the Yarmouth steamer Armourer in the Humber estuary.

Hebble was requisitioned by the Admiralty in the World War I. She struck a mine and sank in the North Sea 1.5 nautical miles (2.8 km) east of Roker, County Durham (54°55′N 1°18′W), England, with the loss of five of her crew. One of the crew that died with the ship was named Archibald Howard, aged 36.
