= SS Calder (1887) =

Freight vessel

History

United Kingdom
- Name: SS Calder
- Operator: 1887–1905: Goole Steam Shipping Company; 1905–1922: Lancashire and Yorkshire Railway; 1922–1923: London and North Western Railway; 1923–1926: London, Midland and Scottish Railway
- Port of registry: (United Kingdom)
- Builder: William Dobson and Co, Walker Yard
- Yard number: 15
- Launched: 7 April 1887
- Out of service: 23 April 1926
- Fate: Scrapped 1926

General characteristics
- Tonnage: 708 gross register tons (GRT)
- Length: 212.5 feet (64.8 m)
- Beam: 28.8 feet (8.8 m)
- Draught: 13.8 feet (4.2 m)

SS Calder was a freight vessel built for the Goole Steam Shipping Company in 1887.

== History ==
The ship was built by William Dobson and Company in Walker Yard as one of a trio of ships including Aire and Ouse for the Goole Steam Shipping Company and launched on 7 April 1887.

In 1905 she was acquired by the Lancashire and Yorkshire Railway. In 1922 she was acquired by the London and North Western Railway. In 1923 she was acquired by the London, Midland and Scottish Railway.

She was sent for scrapping on 23 April 1926.
