= SS Ouse (1884) =

History
- Name: 1884–1910: SS Ouse; 1910–1929: SS Goole Trader; 1929–1947: SS Tervsund
- Operator: 1887–1905: Goole Steam Shipping Company; 1905–1910: Lancashire and Yorkshire Railway; 1910–1927: Angfartygs Aktiebolag Transito (H Wilen), Abo; 1927–1929: Th Kramer, Abo; 1929–1947: Pargas Kalkbergs Aktiebolag, Pargas
- Port of registry: (United Kingdom)
- Builder: William Dobson and Co, Walker Yard
- Yard number: 5
- Launched: 10 July 1884
- Fate: Wrecked 13 September 1947

General characteristics
- Tonnage: 763 gross register tons (GRT)
- Length: 220.8 feet (67.3 m)
- Beam: 30.4 feet (9.3 m)
- Draught: 13.8 feet (4.2 m)

SS Ouse was a passenger and freight vessel built for the Goole Steam Shipping Company in 1884.

== History ==
The ship was built by William Dobson and Company in Walker Yard as one of a trio of ships including Aire and Calder for the Goole Steam Shipping Company and launched on 10 July 1884. She was described in the Shields Daily Gazette of 12 July 1884 as

constructed with a topgallant forecastle fitted for the crew, long bridge house extending over the engine and boiler room, and poop which will be handsomely fitted up for the comfortable accommodation of first-class passengers. The machinery [was to be] supplied by R and W Hawthorn, and will develop 600 hp, being greatly in excess of that usually fitted. All modern appliances have been provided for the rapid dispatch in loading and unloading cargo, special winches having been prepared to the company’s own design, as also has the steering gear.

In 1905 she was acquired by the Lancashire and Yorkshire Railway. In 1910 she was sold to Angfartygs Aktiebolag Transito (H Wilen), Abo and renamed Goole Trader. In 1927 she was purchased by Th Kramer, Abo, and two years later in 1929 by Pargas Kalkbergs Aktiebolag, Paragas. She was renamed Tervsund.

She was wrecked on 13 September 1947 near Varberg on a voyage from Landskrona to Middlesbrough.
