= SS Humber =

20th century passenger and freight vessel

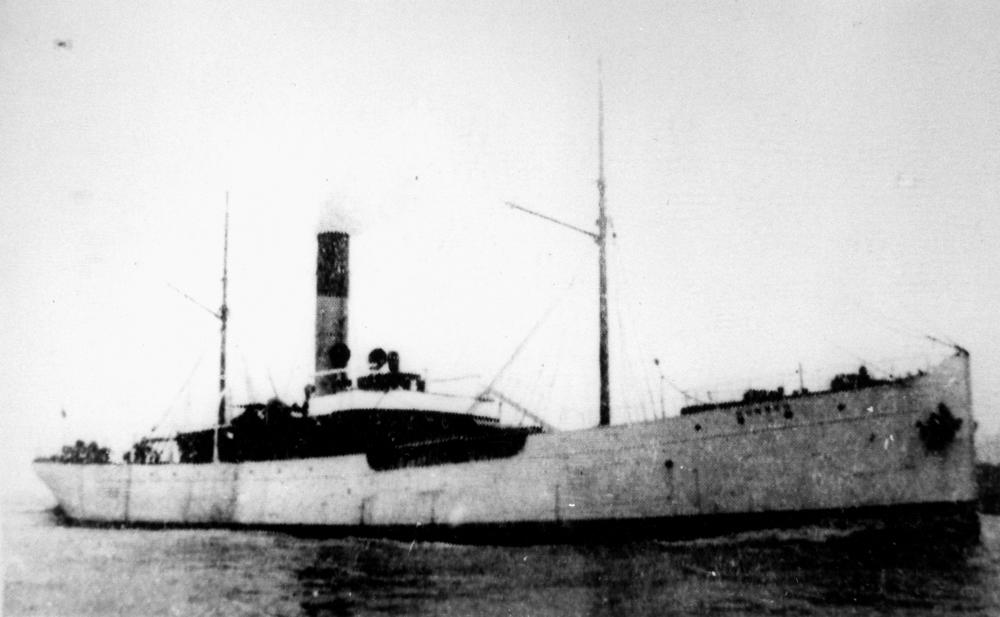

History
- Name: 1903–1912: SS Humber
- Operator: 1903–1905: Goole Steam Shipping Company; 1906–1912: Lancashire and Yorkshire Railway
- Port of registry: (United Kingdom)
- Builder: A MacMillan and Company, Dumbarton
- Yard number: 391
- Launched: 26 August 1903
- Fate: Sunk 12 February 1912

General characteristics
- Tonnage: 1,023 gross register tons (GRT)
- Length: 240 feet (73 m)
- Beam: 33 feet (10 m)
- Draught: 15.7 feet (4.8 m)

SS Humber was a passenger and freight vessel built for the Goole Steam Shipping Company in 1903.

== History ==
She was built in 1903 by A MacMillan in Dumbarton as one of a trio of ships which included SS Nidd and SS Colne. She was launched on 26 August 1903. In 1905 she came under the ownership of the Lancashire and Yorkshire Railway.

On 9 June 1910 she was in collision with the German steamer Modena, owned by Robert M Sloman Jr. The Modena sank within 9 minutes, and the crew of the Humber managed to save all but two of the thirty crew members. For their actions, the German Emperor presented Captain Prentice with a gold watch, Chief Officer Sherwood with a pair of binoculars, and Seaman Bennett with £5.

She sank in the mouth of the River Elbe on 12 February 1912 during a voyage from Goole to Hamburg after a collision in fog with the German vessel Answald. The Answald had hit the Humber amidships, making a hole 20 feet (6.1 m) long. The crew of the Humber were rescued by the Answald which had only suffered damage to her bows.
