= Skarstein =

Village in Andøy Municipality, Norway

Skarstein Skardstein
- Village
- Interactive map of Skarstein
- Location within Nordland Location within Norway
- Coordinates: 69.2481°N 16.1290°E
- Country: Norway
- Region: Northern Norway
- County: Nordland
- District: Vesterålen
- Municipality: Andøy Municipality
- Elevation: 7 m (23 ft)
- Time zone: UTC+01:00 (CET)
  - Summer (DST): UTC+02:00 (CEST)
- Post Code: 8485 Dverberg

Skarstein is a village in Andøy Municipality in Nordland county, Norway. The village is located along Norwegian County Road 82 on the northeastern part of the island of Andøya, along the Andfjorden. The village of Andenes lies about 10 kilometres (6.2 mi) to the north, and the village of Fiskenes lies about 2 kilometres (1.2 mi) to the northeast.

== Trivia ==
The village itself is named after a large rock near the local harbor, named Skarvesteinen, meaning "The Cormorant rock" in Norwegian. Its name is derived from the Cormorants that usually inhabit the rock's surface.
