= SS Aire =

Freight vessel built for the Goole Steam Shipping Company in 1886

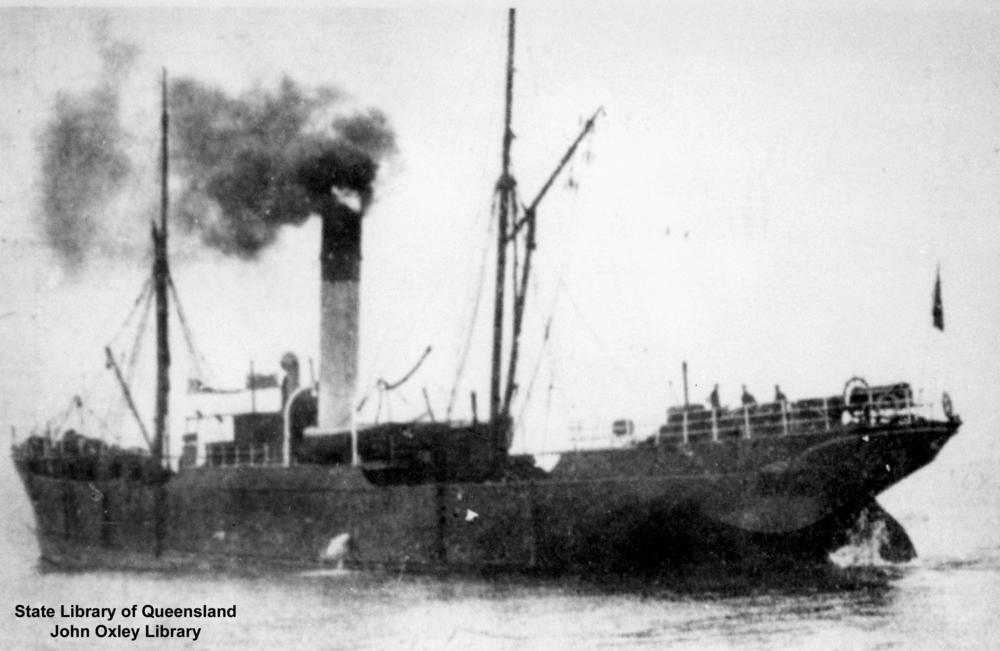
- Aire

History
- Name: Aire
- Namesake: River Aire
- Operator: 1886–1905: Goole Steam Shipping Company; 1905–1922: Lancashire and Yorkshire Railway; 1922–1923: London and North Western Railway; 1923–1930: London, Midland and Scottish Railway
- Port of registry: (United Kingdom) Goole
- Builder: William Dobson and Co, Walker Yard
- Yard number: 14
- Launched: 27 November 1886
- Out of service: 4 October 1930
- Fate: Scrapped 1930

General characteristics
- Tonnage: 698 gross register tons (GRT)
- Length: 212.5 feet (64.8 m)
- Beam: 28.8 feet (8.8 m)
- Draught: 13.8 feet (4.2 m)

SS Aire was a cargo steamship built for the Goole Steam Shipping Company in 1886.

== History ==
The ship was built by William Dobson and Company in Walker Yard for the Goole Steam Shipping Company as one of a trio of ships including Calder and Ouse and launched on 27 November 1886.

In 1905 she was acquired by the Lancashire and Yorkshire Railway. In 1922 she was acquired by the London and North Western Railway and in 1923 by the London, Midland and Scottish Railway.

She was sent for scrapping on 4 October 1930.
