= SS Wharfe (1890) =

British passenger and freight vessel

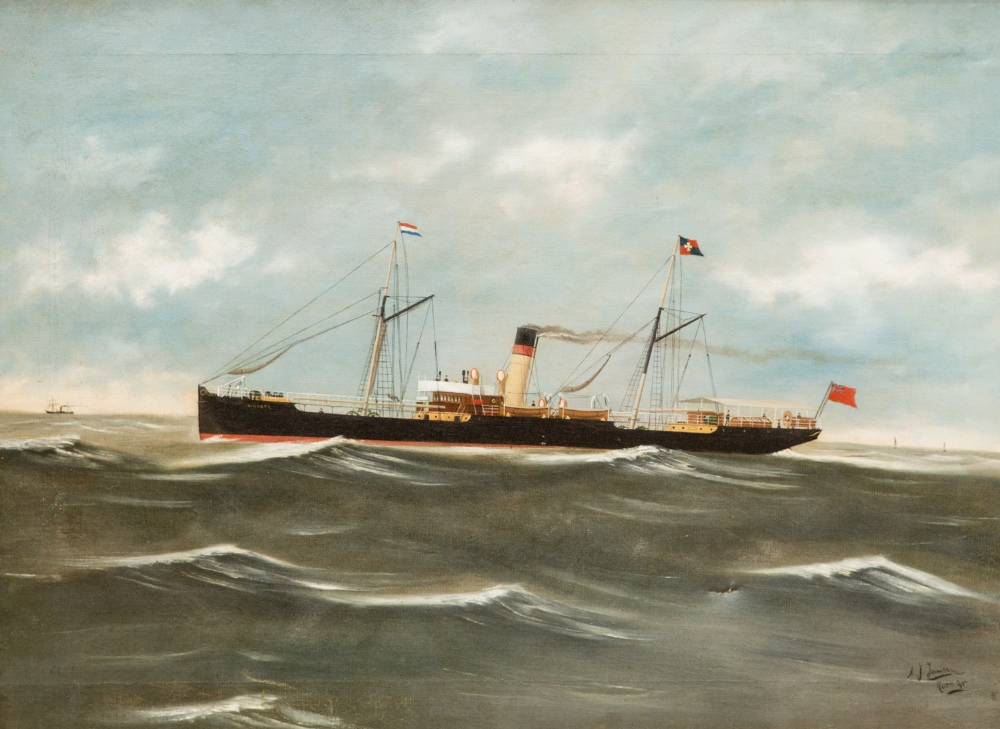
- The Wharfe at Sea, by Alfred J. Jansen

History
- Name: SS Wharfe
- Operator: 1890–1905: Goole Steam Shipping Company; 1905–1922: Lancashire and Yorkshire Railway; 1922–1923: London and North Western Railway; 1923–1933: London, Midland and Scottish Railway
- Port of registry: (United Kingdom)
- Builder: William Dobson and Co, Walker Yard
- Yard number: 38
- Launched: 23 April 1890
- Out of service: 1933
- Fate: Scrapped 1933

General characteristics
- Tonnage: 914 gross register tons (GRT)
- Length: 245 feet (75 m)
- Beam: 32.7 feet (10.0 m)
- Draught: 15.7 feet (4.8 m)

SS Wharfe was a passenger and freight vessel built for the Goole Steam Shipping Company in 1890.

== History ==
The ship was built by William Dobson and Company in Walker Yard for the Goole Steam Shipping Company and launched on 23 April 1890. She was taken to sea for trial on 5 June 1890 and achieved 15.5 knots.

On 24 November 1895 she was in collision with the sailing smack Plover. The smack was sunk and the crew were rescued by the Wharfe which returned to Hull.

In 1902 she was equipped with new boilers and funnel from the Wallsend Engineering Company. Despite being recognised as the fastest ship in the fleet, these improvements were intended to accelerate her speed further.

In 1905 she was acquired by the Lancashire and Yorkshire Railway. In 1922 she was acquired by the London and North Western Railway and one year later by the London, Midland and Scottish Railway.

She was scrapped in 1933 by Thos. W. Ward at Barrow in Furness.
