= SS Altona (1877) =

Freight Vessel

History
- Name: 1877–1914: SS Altona; 1914–1927: SS River Crake
- Operator: 1877–1895: Yorkshire Coal and Steamship Company; 1895–1905: Goole Steam Shipping Company; 1905–1922: Lancashire and Yorkshire Railway; 1922–1923: London and North Western Railway; 1923–1927: London, Midland and Scottish Railway
- Port of registry: (United Kingdom)
- Builder: William Thompson, Dundee
- Yard number: 19
- Launched: 13 February 1877
- Out of service: 1927
- Fate: Scrapped 1927

General characteristics
- Tonnage: 672 gross register tons (GRT)
- Length: 202.1 feet (61.6 m)
- Beam: 28.2 feet (8.6 m)
- Depth: 13 feet (4.0 m)

SS Altona was a freight vessel built for the Yorkshire Coal and Steamship Company in 1877. The ship was scrapped in 1927.

== History ==
The ship was built by William Thompson of Dundee for the Yorkshire Coal and Steamship Company and launched on 13 February 1877.

in 1895 she was acquired by the Goole Steam Shipping Company.

In 1905 she was acquired by the Lancashire and Yorkshire Railway. In 1914 she was requisitioned by the Admiralty and renamed River Crake. She returned to railway company control in 1916.

In 1922 she was acquired by the London and North Western Railway and one year later by the London, Midland and Scottish Railway.

She was scrapped in 1927.
