= SS Colne =

History
- Name: SS Colne (1903–1906)
- Operator: 1903–1905: Goole Steam Shipping Company; 1905–1906: Lancashire and Yorkshire Railway
- Port of registry: (United Kingdom)
- Builder: Clyde Shipbuilding Company Port Glasgow
- Yard number: 256
- Launched: 25 July 1903
- Out of service: 11 March 1906
- Fate: Sunk 11 March 1906

General characteristics
- Tonnage: 875 gross register tons (GRT)
- Length: 234.6 feet (71.5 m)
- Beam: 31.6 feet (9.6 m)

SS Colne was a freight vessel built for the Goole Steam Shipping Company in 1903.

== History ==
She was built in 1903 by the Cylde Shipbuilding Company Port Glasgow as one of a trio of ships which included SS Nidd and SS Humber. She was launched on 25 July 1903.

In 1905 she came under the ownership of the Lancashire and Yorkshire Railway.

She sank on 11 March 1906 when her cargo of coal shifted in a storm. Fifteen horses penned between the decks were drowned. Twelve of the crew were drowned, and seven were rescued from a lifeboat by the crew of the Ramsgate fishing vessel Uncle Dick.
