= John J. Robinson =

American author and historian (c. 1918 – 1996)

John J. Robinson (c. 1918 – 1996) was an American author, best known as the author of Born in Blood: The Lost Secrets of Freemasonry. He is also credited as being the "founding visionary" of the Masonic Information Center run by the Masonic Service Association of North America. He was a member of the Medieval Academy of America, the Organization of American Historians, and the Royal Over-Seas League of London.

== Biography ==
Prior to becoming a writer, Robinson had worked as a farmer, a business executive, and also served in the United States Marine Corps.

== Born in Blood ==
Robinson's first work, Born in Blood, published in 1990, (Note: Reliable sources appear with both 1989 and 1990 as publishing dates.) traced the connections of the Knights Templar and the Freemasons. The author says that it is considered an important work, but its initial reception was very poor: he says in the preface to A Pilgrim's Path that "not even one newspaper in the United States saw fit to review a book that had the word Freemasonry in the title." He says that was, however, great demand from libraries, which in turn led to what he considered to be a positive review in Publishers Weekly. Kirkus Reviews gave the book a positive review, and it was also reviewed by Library Journal and Midwest Book Review.

It has also been reviewed by many Masonic research publications, Masonic magazines, and websites. The Freemason John Hamill, reviewing the book for Ars Quatuor Coronatorum considers that the book "has many positive things to say about Freemasonry but, unfortunately, the basic thesis is seriously flawed."

Robinson says that the book was originally intended to be about the Peasants' Revolt of 1381, but instead traced the fall of the Knights Templar, which he connected to the rise of Freemasonry. As a result of his research for this book, he became more interested in Freemasonry and subsequently wrote A Pilgrim's Path: Freemasonry and the Religious Right.

== Dungeon, Fire, and Sword: The Knights Templar in the Crusades ==
Robinson's second book focused exclusively on the Knights Templar in the Crusades. Kirkus considered it not as strong as his previous work, saying that it was "little more than reference material for die-hard Crusade fans." The Ocala Star-Banner, on the other hand, reviewed it very positively, stating that "it is so readable that putting it down is impossible."

== A Pilgrim's Path: Freemasonry and the Religious Right ==
Robinson's third book explores the anti-Masonic claims made by the religious right (primarily in the United States). The book is divided into two parts: the first outlines the history of the claims and attempts to debunk them. The second suggests ways that the fraternity could prevent such claims from arising in the first place.

== Works ==
Books

- Born in Blood: The Lost Secrets of Freemasonry (1990) ISBN 978-0-87131-602-8
- Dungeon, Fire and Sword: The Knights Templar in the Crusades (1992) ISBN 978-0-87131-657-8
- A Pilgrim's Path: Freemasonry and the Religious Right (1993) ISBN 978-0-87131-732-2

Papers

- "Albert Pike and the Morning Star." Heredom: The Transactions of the Scottish Rite Research Society, Volume 1 (1992)

== Awards and honors ==
- Fellow of the Maine Lodge of Research, 1993
- Fellow of The Philalethes Society
- Distinguished Service Medal, The Philalethes Society
