= Fiskenes =

Village in Andøy Municipality, Norway

- Village
- Interactive map of Fiskenes
- Location within Nordland Location within Norway
- Coordinates: 69.2608°N 16.1705°E
- Country: Norway
- Region: Northern Norway
- County: Nordland
- District: Vesterålen
- Municipality: Andøy Municipality
- Elevation: 3 m (9.8 ft)
- Time zone: UTC+01:00 (CET)
  - Summer (DST): UTC+02:00 (CEST)
- Post Code: 8485 Dverberg

Fiskenes is a village in Andøy Municipality in Nordland county, Norway. The village is located on the northeastern part of the island of Andøya, along the Andfjorden. The village of Andenes lies about 10 kilometres (6.2 mi) to the north, and the village of Skarstein lies about 2 kilometres (1.2 mi) to the south. The population is approximately 50 people.
