= SS Ralph Creyke (1879) =

History
- Name: SS Ralph Creke
- Operator: 1879–1905: Goole Steam Shipping Company; 1905–1909: Lancashire and Yorkshire Railway; 1909–1912: Ouse Steamship Company
- Port of registry: (United Kingdom)
- Builder: Short Brothers, Sunderland
- Yard number: 101
- Launched: July 1879
- Fate: Sank 16 October 1912

General characteristics
- Tonnage: 633 gross register tons (GRT)
- Length: 176.4 feet (53.8 m)
- Beam: 30 feet (9.1 m)
- Depth: 13.4 feet (4.1 m)

SS Ralph Creyke was a passenger and freight vessel built for the Goole Steam Shipping Company in 1879.

== History ==
She replaced a vessel of the same name Ralph Creyke built in 1878 which had foundered in 1879 off Lundy Island. The replacement ship was built by Short Brothers, Sunderland for the Goole Steam Shipping Company and launched in July 1879.

in 1886 she was in collision with the Richard Moxon which resulted in the Richard Moxon being towed into Yarmouth Roads.

In 1905 she was acquired by the Lancashire and Yorkshire Railway. In December 1902 a fire broke out in the hold as she was coming up the Humber estuary. On reaching Hull, Captain Campbell moored up alongside the Albert Dock Promenade and the North-Eastern and Police Fire Brigades arrived and fought the fire for several hours.

Ralph Creyke was sold in 1909. Her captain, Edward Atkinson formed the Ouse Steamship Company, and she was the first ship of this new company.

On 28 August 1912, Ralph Creyke′s sister ship Derwent was anchored midstream at Goole waiting to enter the lock when a strong southerly wind caused Derwent to sheer into Ralph Creyke, which was outbound with a full cargo of coal. Derwent’s anchor chain became caught in Ralph Creyke’s propeller and her engines were stopped. The accident required Ralph Creyke to be drydocked to undergo expensive repairs to remove the chain.

After the completion of repairs, Ralph Creyke returned to service, but on 16 October 1912, less than two months after her collision with Derwent, she sank in the North Sea near Flushing, the Netherlands, after a collision with the Danish steamer Viking.
