= SMS Dresden =

SMS Dresden may refer to one of these ships in the German Imperial Navy:

- SMS Dresden (1907), a Dresden-class cruiser launched in 1907
- SMS Dresden (1917), a Cöln-class cruiser launched in 1916
