= SS Dresden (1884) =

Freight vessel built for the Yorkshire Coal and Steamship Company in 1877

History
- Name: SS Dresden
- Operator: 1884–1895: Yorkshire Coal and Steamship Company; 1895–1904: Goole Steam Shipping Company; 1904–1916: West Hartlepool Steam Navigation Company; 1916–1925: Mann Macneal and Company Limited, Glasgow
- Port of registry: (United Kingdom)
- Builder: William Thompson, Dundee
- Yard number: 59
- Launched: 5 June 1884
- Out of service: 1925
- Fate: Scrapped 1925

General characteristics
- Tonnage: 822 gross register tons (GRT)
- Length: 230 feet (70 m)
- Beam: 32 feet (9.8 m)
- Depth: 13.6 feet (4.1 m)
- Installed power: 160 hp
- Speed: 13 knots

SS Dresden was a freight vessel built for the Yorkshire Coal and Steamship Company in 1877.

== History ==
The ship was built by William Thompson of Dundee for the Yorkshire Coal and Steamship Company and launched on 13 February 1877. She was launched by Miss Meek, eldest daughter of Alexander Meek of Glenville, Brough,

In 1895 she was acquired by the Goole Steam Shipping Company. In 1904 she was acquired by the West Hartlepool Steam Navigation Company. In 1916 she was sold to Mann Macneal and Company Limited, Glasgow who kept her until 1925 when she was scrapped.
