= SS Nidd =

Freight vessel

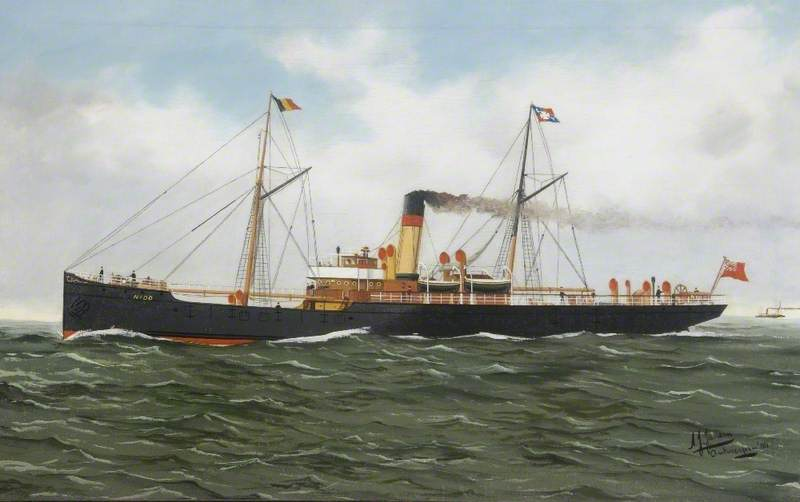
- SS Nidd, by A. J. Jansen

History
- Name: 1903–1933: SS Nidd
- Operator: 1903–1905: Goole Steam Shipping Company; 1905–1906: Lancashire and Yorkshire Railway; 1922–1923: London and North Western Railway; 1923–1933: London, Midland and Scottish Railway
- Port of registry: (United Kingdom)
- Builder: William Dobson and Company, Walker Yard, River Tyne
- Yard number: 112
- Launched: 30 July 1900
- Fate: Scrapped 28 August 1933

General characteristics
- Tonnage: 996 gross register tons (GRT)
- Length: 235 feet (72 m)
- Beam: 33 feet (10 m)
- Draught: 15.6 feet (4.8 m)

SS Nidd was a freight vessel built for the Goole Steam Shipping Company in 1900.

== History ==
She was built in 1900 by the Cylde Shipbuilding Company Port Glasgow as one of a trio of ships which included SS Colne and SS Humber, both built in 1903, for the Goole Steam Shipping Company. As well as the capacity for 1,300 tons of cargo she had provision for carrying 100 horses as deck cargo. She was launched on 30 July 1900 and arrived in Goole on 31 August 1900.

In 1905 she came under the ownership of the Lancashire and Yorkshire Railway. On 23 January 1913, in the Humber estuary, the Wilson liner Argyll collided with Nidd, which was lying at anchor.

Nidd operated in both cross-channel service and the Mediterranean during World War I. On 13 May 1918, she collided with the Roya Navy trawler HMT Balfour in the English Channel 5 nautical miles (9.3 km) west-southwest of the Royal Sovereign Lightship; Balfour sank, and Nidd rescued her crew.

Nidd returned to her owners′ Antwerp service in 1919. In 1922 she was taken over by the London and North Western Railway, and in 1923 the London, Midland and Scottish Railway. Towards the end of her career in 1932 she was chartered to the Great Western Railway for the Weymouth-to-Jersey trade. On 28 August 1933 she arrived in Mostyn for scrapping.
