= SS Ralph Creyke (1878) =

Passenger and freight ship

History
- Name: SS Ralph Creke
- Operator: Goole Steam Shipping Company
- Port of registry: (United Kingdom)
- Builder: Hardcastle and Watson, Pallion, Sunderland
- Launched: 22 March 1878
- Sponsored by: Miss Creyke
- Fate: Foundered 20 February 1879

General characteristics
- Tonnage: 553 gross register tons (GRT)
- Length: 165 feet (50 m)
- Beam: 30 feet (9.1 m)
- Draught: 12.6 feet (3.8 m)
- Depth: 13.6 feet (4.1 m)

SS Ralph Creyke was a passenger and freight vessel built for the Goole Steam Shipping Company in 1878.

== History ==
The ship was built by Hardcastle and Watson, Pallion, Sunderland for the Goole Steam Shipping Company, named after the former local MP Ralph Creyke, and launched on 21 March 1878 by Miss Creyke. The engines were fitted by Patterson and Atkinson, St. Lawrence Engine Works, Newcastle.

On 20 February 1879, Ralph Creyke foundered in a storm in the Celtic Sea 16 miles southwest of Lundy Island during a voyage from Cardiff, Wales, to Dieppe, France. Her name was used for a replacement vessel, Ralph Creyke, which was delivered later that year.
