= 1906 Florida hurricane =

1906 Florida hurricane may refer to:

- The 1906 Florida Keys hurricane, a Category 3 hurricane which killed over 240 people
- The 1906 Mississippi hurricane, a Category 3 hurricane which caused catastrophic impacts in Pensacola and Mobile, Alabama
