= 1906 Florida Keys hurricane =

Category 3 Atlantic hurricane in 1906

Coordinates: 24.5658°N 81.7618°W

Hurricane Eight 1906 Florida Keys hurricane
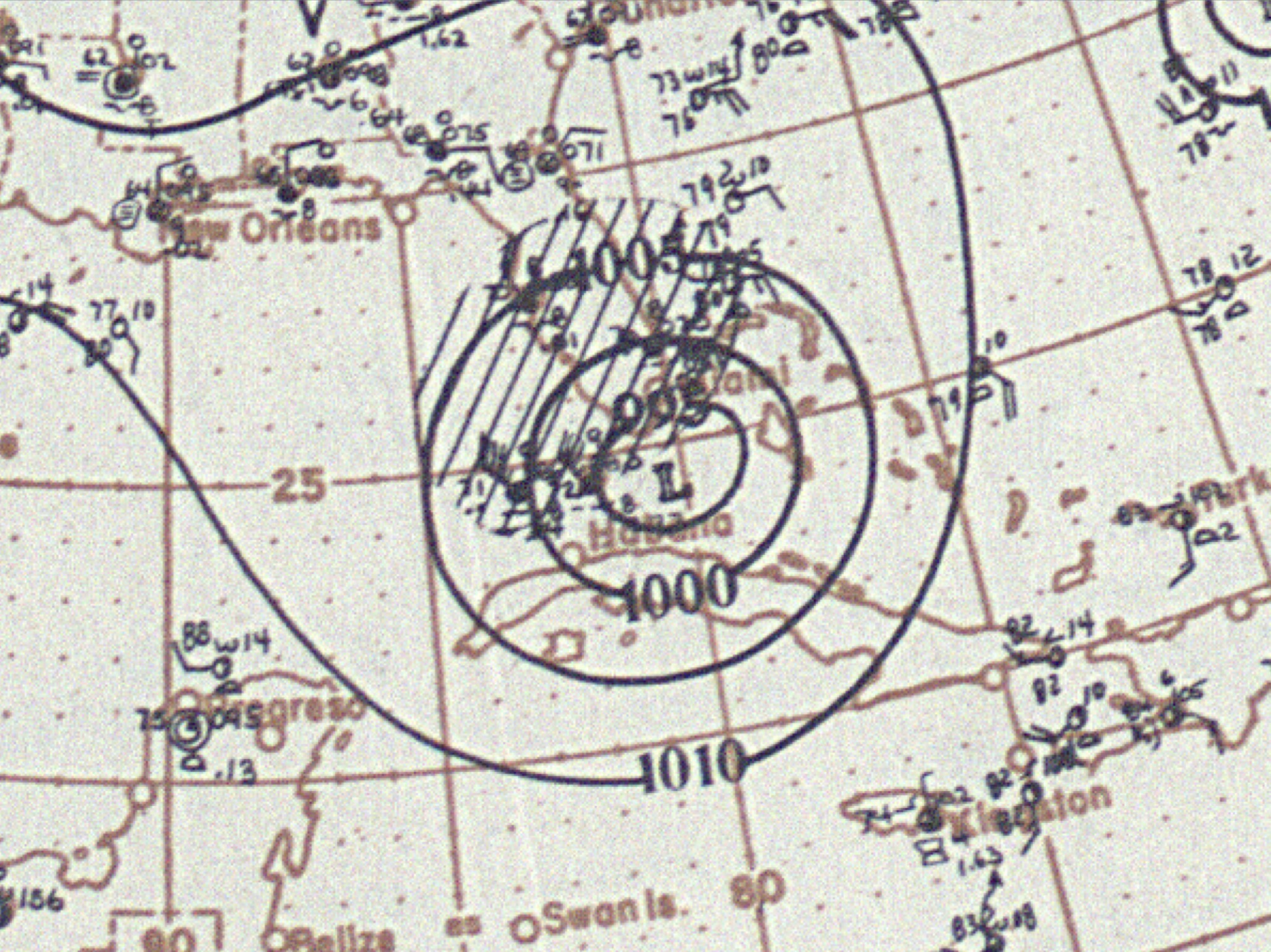
- Weather map of the hurricane nearing landfall in the Florida Keys on October 18

Meteorological history
- Formed: October 8, 1906
- Dissipated: October 23, 1906

Category 3 major hurricane
- 1-minute sustained (SSHWS/NWS)
- Highest winds: 120 mph (195 km/h)
- Lowest pressure: 953 mbar (hPa); 28.14 inHg

Overall effects
- Fatalities: At least 240
- Damage: >$4.14 million (1906 USD)
- Areas affected: Central America, Cuba, southeastern United States
- IBTrACS
- Part of the 1906 Atlantic hurricane season

The 1906 Florida Keys hurricane was a powerful and deadly hurricane that had a major impact on Cuba and southern Florida. The fifth hurricane and third major hurricane of the season, the storm formed from a system near Barbados on October 4. By October 8, it had intensified into a tropical storm, and made landfall as a hurricane in Central America. The hurricane traveled towards Cuba, making landfall and wreaking havoc on the island. The storm then made a third landfall in the Florida Keys during the evening of October 18. At least 240 people were killed as a result of the hurricane, (Note: The hurricane killed at least 240 people: 135 died on the Florida East Coast Railway, 104 of them on Houseboat No. 4; at least 70 drowned on the steamers St. Lucia and Peerless; 20 died in Havana; 9 were killed in Batabano; and 6 people died in plantations in the Florida Keys.) and damages totaled at least $4,135,000. (Note: Damages caused by the hurricane totaled to at least $4,135,000: Miami suffered $160,000 in damages; the Florida East Coast Railway had $200,000 in damages; Houseboat No. 4 had at least $50,000 in damages; Havana suffered $2,000,000 in damages; Puerto Limon suffered $125,000 in damages to its rubber and banana crops; several fruit plantations' losses in Central America amounted to $1,000,000; and the wrecks of Peerless and Sara totaled $600,000 in damage.)

Of the 240 people killed during the storm, 135 were workers on the Florida East Coast Railway. The hurricane eventually led to the end of pineapple production in the Florida Keys for commercial purposes in 1915, although this was amplified by two further hurricanes in the following years.

== Meteorological history ==
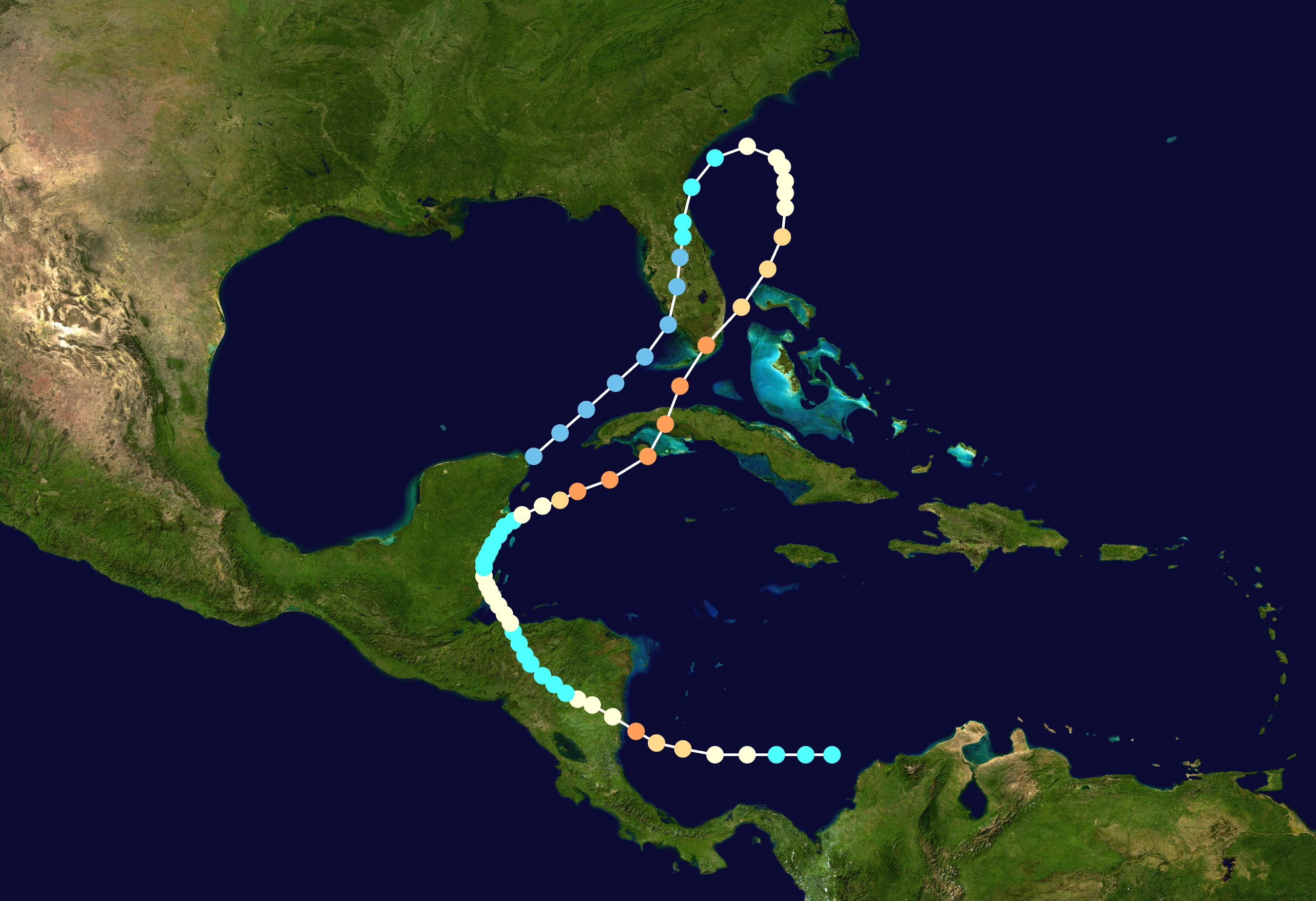
Map plotting the storm's track and intensity, according to the Saffir–Simpson scale Map key Saffir–Simpson scale Tropical depression (≤38 mph, ≤62 km/h) Tropical storm (39–73 mph, 63–118 km/h) Category 1 (74–95 mph, 119–153 km/h) Category 2 (96–110 mph, 154–177 km/h) Category 3 (111–129 mph, 178–208 km/h) Category 4 (130–156 mph, 209–251 km/h) Category 5 (≥157 mph, ≥252 km/h) Unknown Storm type Tropical cyclone Subtropical cyclone Extratropical cyclone, remnant low, tropical disturbance, or monsoon depression

The hurricane originated from a "cyclonic perturbation" near Barbados on October 4, as reported by local newspapers. On October 5, no closed circulation was evident in the system. In Colón, Panama, a report was sent to the Weather Bureau, reporting sinking barometric pressures on October 6. It was recognized as a tropical storm early on October 8, with winds of 40 mph (65 km/h), while located in the southwestern Caribbean.

As the system continued to move west on October 9, it strengthened into a hurricane, and while it began to curve toward the west-northwest, further strengthening occurred, as it intensified into a Category 2 hurricane. The hurricane made landfall in Nicaragua on October 10 as a Category 3 hurricane. The system quickly weakened to a tropical storm as it traveled west-northwestward on October 11, later passing over the Gulf of Honduras. It later struck Belize on October 13 as a strong Category 1 hurricane on October 13, tracking north-northwestward.

The system weakened into a tropical storm by October 14 but restrengthened into a Category 1 hurricane by October 16. As the hurricane began to turn northeastward, it continued to intensify, attaining Category 3 status by early October 17. The hurricane continued to approach Havana during the day, and the hurricane's center passed east of Havana during the evening. The hurricane passed over southern Florida on the morning of October 18 moving northeastward, and over the next few days turned north and slowed down to the east of South Carolina. The hurricane began to weaken as it was forced to curve south-southwestward, striking Florida again as the result of a high-pressure area. The system eventually weakened to a tropical depression over Florida, and traced southwestward into the Gulf of Mexico. On October 23, the remnants of the hurricane struck Central America and dissipated on October 23.

== Preparations and impact ==
Deaths and damage by region
Region	Deaths	Damage
Florida	211+	$420,000+
Cuba	29+	$2,000,000+
Costa Rica	None	$1,000,000+
Honduras	None	$1,000,000+
Other	—	$600,000+
Total	240+	$4,135,000+

=== Central America ===
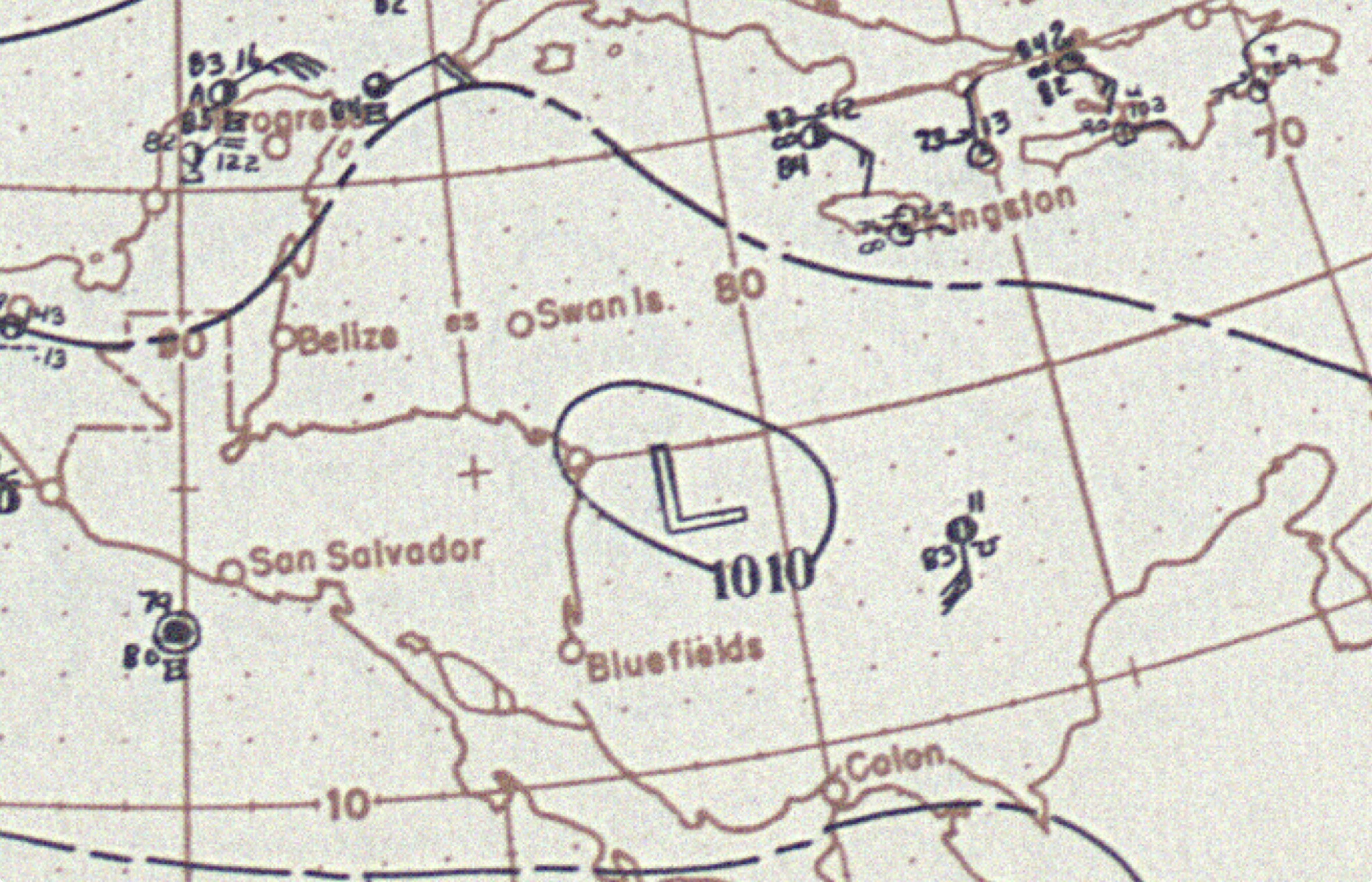
Surface weather analysis of the hurricane nearing landfall in Nicaragua on October 10

The town of Bluefields suffered moderate damage during the hurricane, including downed trees and damage to roofs. In western Nicaragua, widespread flooding damaged roads and disrupted the construction of a port in Corinto. In Matagalpa, many plantations were severely damaged, in addition to the destruction of bridges and roads in the city. Several landslides occurred, leading to the destruction of many hills. In addition, local crops suffered much damage, including much of the local banana and rubber crops. A large wave measuring 15 feet (4.6 m) caused by the storm was described off Nicaragua, and caused brief disappearances of the Seal Cays. Along the Mosquito Coast, the town of Prinzapolka was nearly wiped out by the hurricane. Damage to fruit plantations in Costa Rica totaled $1,000,000.

=== Cuba ===
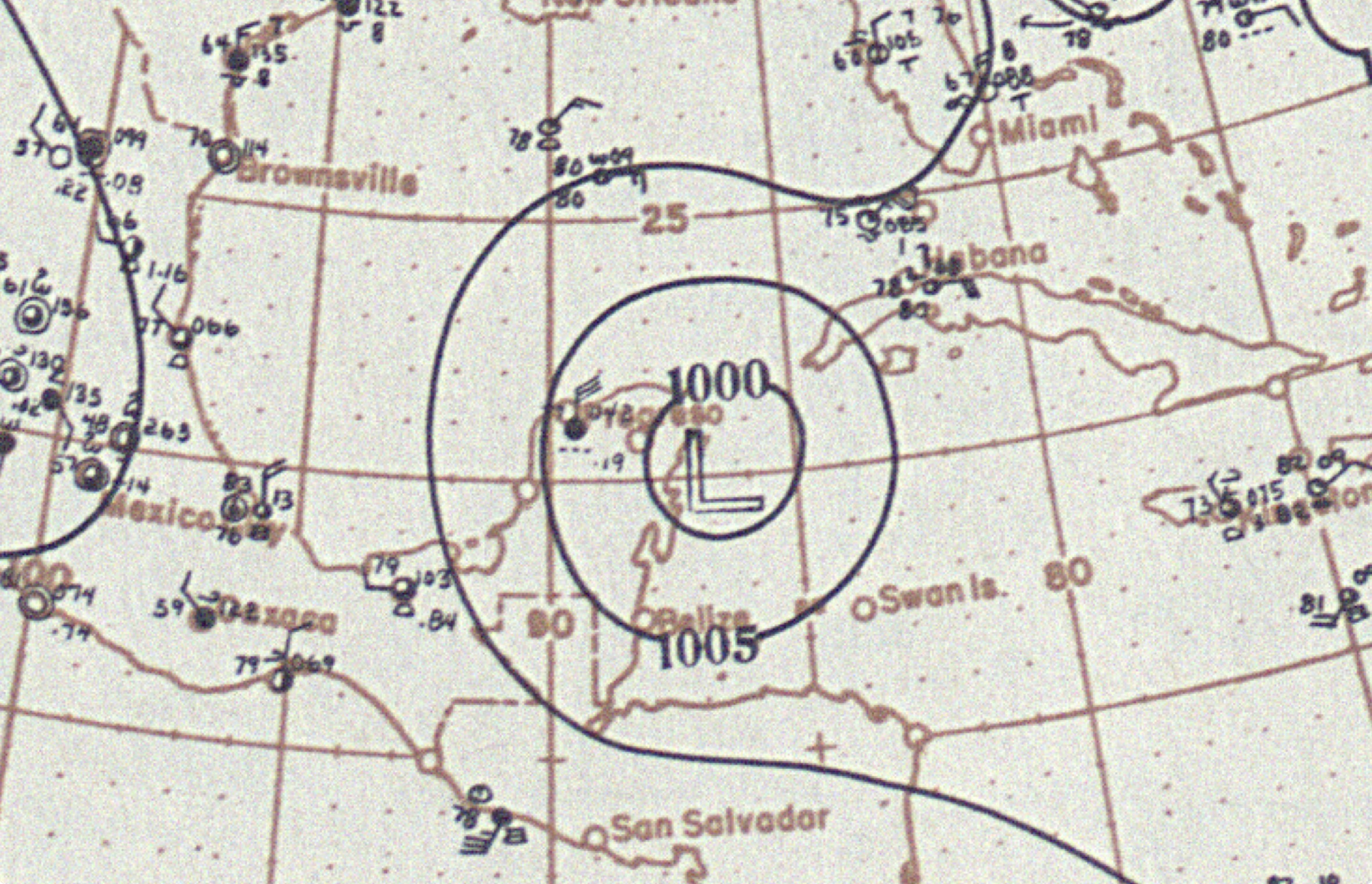
Weather map of the hurricane intensifying as it approaches Cuba on October 16

Havana sustained major damage from the hurricane, with 50 houses destroyed, and cable operators in Miami, Santiago, and Jamaica were unable to reach telegraph services in the city. The wall of the American legation was blown down. Vedado's sea baths were severely damaged. Havana's streetcar service was temporarily disrupted by the storm. Trees were blown down in the parks of Havana. Twenty people were killed in the city, while in Batabanó, nine people were killed, with many others missing. In Matanzas, the location of the United States' 28th Infantry, tents were destroyed and there was widespread damage. However, nobody was killed or injured in the city. In San Luis, tobacco crops were ruined, and 150 tobacco barns in the Alquízar municipality were destroyed. The sugar crop in Pinar del Río Province survived well during the hurricane. In the La Guria section of Cuba, the banana crops were completely destroyed. Rivers topped their banks throughout the country.

=== Florida ===
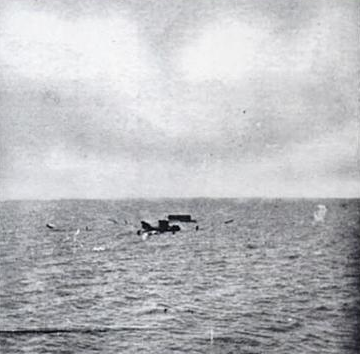
The remains of the steamer St. Lucia after the hurricane

In Miami, over 100 houses were destroyed, and the Episcopal and Methodist churches were completely destroyed. The jail in Miami was nearly completely dismantled, and the prisoners were evacuated. In Fort Pierce, the Peninsula and Occidental railcar sheds collapsed, with the roofs blown away. A two-story brick saloon was destroyed during the hurricane. The Miami telegraph office reported street flooding in the city, and that the telegraph office was flooded. Damage in Miami amounted to $160,000. In Key West, houses and trees were knocked down. In St. Augustine, the tide was described as the "highest in ten years," where streets were flooded throughout the city. At least 70 passengers on the steamers St. Lucia and Peerless drowned during the storm near Elliott Key. The steamers Campbell and the Sara were destroyed near the Isle of Pines, and the Elmora sank. Telegraph lines were also down south of Jupiter.

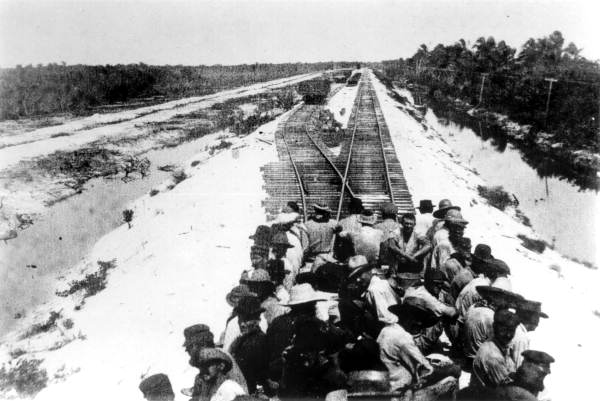
About 135 workers on the Florida East Coast Railway were killed from the hurricane

The effects of the hurricane were most severe on the Florida East Coast Railway, where at least 135 people died, 104 of them on Houseboat No. 4, one of the railway's boats. Many of the workers were swept to sea on barges and flatboats; however, the steamer Jenny rescued 42 workers, who were dropped off at Key West, while another 24 were sent to Savannah, Georgia. The railway's losses totaled about $200,000. Construction was disrupted for a whole year by the storm, as equipment was reassembled and repaired. Many farmers on the Florida Keys suffered large losses; orange groves and fields of pineapples were devastated by the storm. Six people died on plantations in the Keys. At the government wharf, the Fessenden was damaged during the hurricane.

== Aftermath ==
Following the hurricane, all workers of the Florida East Coast Railway were provided with wooden barracks on land, and several additional safety measures were enforced. The hurricane eventually led to the end of the commercial production of pineapples in the Florida Keys.

In 1947, Project Cirrus attempted to use the method of cloud seeding in a hurricane. Approximately 180 pounds (82 kg) of crushed dry ice were seeded into the 1947 hurricane. The system was successfully seeded; however, soon after the seeding, the hurricane changed course and traced toward Charleston, South Carolina. Following the seeding, the project was cancelled and numerous lawsuits were filed as the result of the sudden change of the path in the storm. However, the similar path of this hurricane prevented the success of the lawsuits.

== See also ==
- List of Category 3 Atlantic hurricanes
- List of Florida hurricanes (1900–1949)
- Florida East Coast Railway
