= List of shipwrecks in 1930 =

The list of shipwrecks in 1930 includes ships sunk, foundered, grounded, or otherwise lost during 1930.

table of contents
1930
Jan	Feb	Mar	Apr
May	Jun	Jul	Aug
Sep	Oct	Nov	Dec
Unknown date

== January ==
=== 1 January ===
List of shipwrecks: 1 January 1930
Ship	State	Description
Mapocho	Chile	The cargo liner ran aground south of Samanco and was abandoned. She was refloated on 3 January.
Sönderberg	Denmark	The cargo ship ran aground on Harris, Outer Hebrides, United Kingdom. All 27 crew survived.

=== 4 January ===
List of shipwrecks: 4 January 1930
Ship	State	Description
Busho Maru	Japan	The cargo ship ran aground in thick fog. The vessel pulled herself off on 7 January.
Edgar Quinet	Marine Nationale	The Edgar Quinet-class cruiser ran aground off Oran, Algeria. All crew were rescued. She broke up on 8 January and was a total loss.

=== 5 January ===
List of shipwrecks: 5 January 1930
Ship	State	Description
Hofplein	Netherlands	The cargo ship ran aground on the Norwegian coast near the Svinøy Lighthouse and broke in two with the loss of five of her 32 crew.

=== 6 January ===
List of shipwrecks: 6 January 1930
Ship	State	Description
Albert Morillon	France	The cargo ship ran aground off Diégo-Suarez, Madagascar and was wrecked.
Ethel	United Kingdom	The salvage vessel sank in the Bristol Channel off Breaksea Point, Glamorgan. The crew were rescued.
Miraman	Argentina	The cargo ship caught fire at Quequen and was a total loss.

=== 7 January ===
List of shipwrecks: 7 January 1930
Ship	State	Description
Limpopo	Portugal	The coaster ran aground in Luderitz Bay on her maiden voyage and was a total loss.
Olga	Denmark	The schooner was wrecked in the North Sea during a gale. She was towed into Ålesund being kept afloat by her cargo.

=== 9 January ===
List of shipwrecks: 9 January 1930
Ship	State	Description
Porthmeor	United Kingdom	The coaster sprang a leak in the Irish Sea and was beached at Ardglass, County Down. She was refloated on 27 January.

=== 10 January ===
List of shipwrecks: 10 January 1930
Ship	State	Description
Edward Luckenbach	United States	The cargo ship ran aground at Block Island, Rhode Island. She was refloated on 5 March.

=== 12 January ===
List of shipwrecks: 12 January 1930
Ship	State	Description
Daiten Maru	Japan	The cargo ship ran aground on Rushiri Island, off Hokkaidō. Salvage efforts were abandoned on 17 January and she was declared a total loss.
Katie	United Kingdom	The schooner broke free from her moorings in Torbay and drifted into the English Channel. Four crew were rescued by the Padstow Lifeboat.
Reine des Cieux	France	The ketch broke free from her moorings in Torbay. Three crew were rescued by the Padstow Lifeboat. She came ashore at Bridport, Dorset and broke up.
HMS St Genny	Royal Navy	The tug foundered in the English Channel 32 nautical miles (59 km) north west of Ouessant, Finistère, France with the loss of 28 of her 33 crew. Survivors were rescued by HMS St. Cyrus (Royal Navy).
The Forester	United Kingdom	The coaster broke free from her moorings in Portland Harbour, Dorset. She was driven against a breakwater and sank. All eight people on board survived.

=== 13 January ===
List of shipwrecks: 13 January 1930
Ship	State	Description
Skauts	Latvia	The cargo ship was driven ashore on Texel, Netherlands. She was refloated on 21 January.
Thyra	Sweden	The cargo ship's propeller shaft fractured. She was driven ashore on the Norwegian coast and was a total loss.
Valentino Coda	Italy	The cargo ship was abandoned in the North Sea (53°28′N 4°22′E). She came ashore on Vlieland, Netherlands. Valentino Coda was refloated on 19 January.

=== 14 January ===
List of shipwrecks: 14 January 1930
Ship	State	Description
Bradfyne	United Kingdom	The cargo ship was beached at Houston, Texas, United States in order to avoid a collision with South American towing the barge Tampico (both United States). She was refloated on 24 January.
Gulfqueen	United States	The cargo ship was driven ashore at Philadelphia, Pennsylvania. She was refloated on 17 January.

=== 16 January ===
List of shipwrecks: 16 January 1930
Ship	State	Description
Ko Chow	United Kingdom	The cargo ship struck rocks off Wuchow, China and was beached.
Marietta Nomikou	Greece	The cargo ship was holed in the Corinth Canal and was beached. She was refloated on 20 January.
Romanie	Belgium	The cargo ship was wrecked in Pridmouth Bay, English Channel. The crew were rescued.

=== 17 January ===
List of shipwrecks: 17 January 1930
Ship	State	Description
Arctic	United States	The 64.42-foot (19.64 m), 62-gross register ton tug was officially abandoned after being disassembled and beached on the Lake Michigan coast of Wisconsin north of the harbor at Manitowoc. Her wreck separated into two sections 800 feet (240 m) apart that lie in 10 to 15 feet (3.0 to 4.6 m) of water 1.5 miles (2.4 km) northeast of the Manitowoc Harbor lighthouse and became partially covered by sand. It is within the boundaries of the Wisconsin Shipwreck Coast National Marine Sanctuary.
Telegraaf 6	Netherlands	The cargo ship collided with Main (Germany) in the Scheldt at Liefkenshoek, Antwerp, Belgium and was beached. She was refloated the next day.

=== 21 January ===
List of shipwrecks: 21 January 1930
Ship	State	Description
Ibero	Spain	The cargo ship departed Cardiff, Glamorgan, United Kingdom for Barcelona. She passed Penarth Head that day. No further trace, presumed foundered with the loss of all hands.

=== 23 January ===
List of shipwrecks: 23 January 1930
Ship	State	Description
Monte Cervantes	Germany	Monte Cervantes. The passenger ship sank with the loss of her captain a day after striking a rock off Ushuaia, Argentina. The rest of her crew and all of her passengers – nearly 1,500 people – were rescued by Vincente Fidel Lopez (Argentina).

=== 26 January ===
List of shipwrecks: 26 January 1930
Ship	State	Description
Daksa	Yugoslavia	The cargo ship issued an SOS in the Atlantic Ocean (42°30′N 9°35′W). No further trace, presumed foundered with the loss of all hands.
W. H. Libby	United States	The cargo ship ran aground at Port Eads, Louisiana. She was refloated on 31 January.

=== 27 January ===
List of shipwrecks: 27 January 1930
Ship	State	Description
Grace Hankinson	United Kingdom	The coaster was towing Ruby L II (United Kingdom). Both vessels were wrecked in the Petit Passage, Nova Scotia, Canada.
Knebworth	United Kingdom	The cargo ship was wrecked near Biarritz, Basses-Pyrénées, France.

=== 28 January ===
List of shipwrecks: 28 January 1930
Ship	State	Description
Edgar F. Coney	United States	The tug sank in the Gulf of Mexico in rough seas and high winds 70 miles (110 km) south east of Port Arthur, Texas. Lost with all 14 hands.

=== 29 January ===
List of shipwrecks: 29 January 1930
Ship	State	Description
Braaland	Norway	The cargo ship ran aground on the Bombay Reef, Paracel Islands and the crew abandoned ship. She was declared a total loss on 4 February.

=== 30 January ===
List of shipwrecks: 30 January 1930
Ship	State	Description
Koshun Maru	Japan	During a voyage from Puget Sound in Washington to East Asia with a cargo of lumber, the steamer ran aground and broke in two in Unimak Pass near Scotch Cap Light on the coast of Unimak Island in the Aleutian Islands.

=== 31 January ===
List of shipwrecks: 31 January 1930
Ship	State	Description
Tyrienne S	United Kingdom	The schooner was destroyed by fire at Harbour Le Cou, Newfoundland.

== February ==
=== 1 February ===
List of shipwrecks: 1 February 1930
Ship	State	Description
Gatwick	United Kingdom	The cargo ship was driven ashore at Methil, Fife. The crew were taken off by breeches buoy. She was refloated on 13 February.

=== 2 February ===
List of shipwrecks: 2 February 1930
Ship	State	Description
Brioni	Italy	The cargo ship foundered in the Adriatic Sea off Vis, Yugoslavia with the loss of two crew.
Hans Maersk	Denmark	The cargo ship collided with Emsland (Germany) in the Kaiser Wilhelm Canal and was beached.

=== 3 February ===
List of shipwrecks: 3 February 1930
Ship	State	Description
Diva	Italy	The barque came ashore at Saint-Raphaël, Var, France. The crew were rescued.
Scheldesop	Belgium	Ran aground on the Goodwin Sands, English Channel. Refloated but leaking, cargo discharged at Ramsgate the ship sailed to Antwerp where she was declared a constructive total loss. Later repaired and returned to service.

=== 4 February ===
List of shipwrecks: 4 February 1930
Ship	State	Description
Albert Second	United Kingdom	The schooner was driven ashore on Isla Contoy, Quintana Roo, Mexico and was wrecked.
Zalophus	United States	The yacht struck a submerged object off Lido Key near Sarasota, Florida and sank.

=== 5 February ===
List of shipwrecks: 5 February 1930
Ship	State	Description
Hav	Norway	The cargo ship broke free from her tow in the Atlantic Ocean off the coast of Portugal. She came ashore at Cape Roca and was wrecked.

=== 7 February ===
List of shipwrecks: 7 February 1930
Ship	State	Description
Tatsuta Maru	Japan	The almost-completed ocean liner was severely damaged by fire at Nagasaki.

=== 8 February ===
List of shipwrecks: 8 February 1930
Ship	State	Description
Hartfield	United Kingdom	The cargo ship struck a rock and was holed in the Dardanelles. She was beached at Çanakkale, Turkey but was refloated the next day.
Oranje	Netherlands	The auxiliary schooner sprang a leak and sank in the Thames Estuary off Southend Pier with the loss of two of her three crew. She was raised on 20 February.

=== 9 February ===
List of shipwrecks: 9 February 1930
Ship	State	Description
Elcano	Spain	The cargo ship sank at her moorings at Valencia, Spain during a gale.
Sveti Duje	Yugoslavia	The cargo ship was driven ashore in Mazarrón Bay. She was refloated on 16 February.

=== 10 February ===
List of shipwrecks: 10 February 1930
Ship	State	Description
Dorothy Baird	Dominion of Newfoundland	The schooner sprang a leak in the Atlantic Ocean (39°42′N 53°07′W) and was abandoned. She was set on fire as salvage was impossible and she was a danger to navigation. The crew were rescued by British Valour (United Kingdom).

=== 11 February ===
List of shipwrecks: 11 February 1930
Ship	State	Description
München	Germany	The ocean liner caught fire and sank at New York, United States. She was subsequently salvaged, repaired and returned to service as General von Steuben.
Vineyard	United Kingdom	The auxiliary sailing vessel was sunk at Irvine, Ayrshire when a railway wagon overran coal drops and fell through the ship.

=== 15 February ===
List of shipwrecks: 15 February 1930
Ship	State	Description
Admiral Benson	United States	The cargo ship ran aground at the mouth of the Columbia River. She was abandoned as a total loss.

=== 16 February ===
List of shipwrecks: 16 February 1930
Ship	State	Description
Beauport	United Kingdom	The cargo ship was wrecked off Guernsey, Channel Islands, in the Little Russel. Towed to a beach next to St Peter Port harbour, she sank, could not be refloated and was blown up with explosives.
Carroll	United States	The ocean-going barge, towed by Montrose (United States), sank in a severe storm south west of Five Fathom Bank light station. Lost with all four hands.
Henry A. McLellan	United Kingdom	The four-masted schooner broke free from here moorings at Meteghan, Nova Scotia, Canada. She was driven into the auxiliary schooners Avon Queen and Edwin G. Farrar (both United Kingdom). All three vessels were beached. Henry A. McLellan was a total loss.

=== 17 February ===
List of shipwrecks: 17 February 1930
Ship	State	Description
Bullmouth	United Kingdom	The tanker collided with Fiumana (Italy) at Istanbul, Turkey and was beached. She was later refloated.
El Paraguayo	United Kingdom	The cargo ship ran aground at Santos, São Paulo, Brazil. She was refloated on 23 February.
Mahone	United Kingdom	The schooner was driven ashore at St. John's, Newfoundland. She was refloated on 22 February.

=== 18 February ===
List of shipwrecks: 18 February 1930
Ship	State	Description
Iron Monarch	Australia	The cargo ship ran aground on Curlew Island, Australia, near the head of Spencer's Gulf. She was refloated, repaired, and returned to service.
Lorraine	United States	While no one was on board, the 9-gross register ton, 36-foot (11.0 m) motor vessel sank in Saginaw Bay (56°55′N 134°16′W) on the north coast of Kuiu Island in the Alexander Archipelago in Southeast Alaska.

=== 19 February ===
List of shipwrecks: 19 February 1930
Ship	State	Description
John Blumer	Norway	The cargo ship caught fire at Rufisque, French West Africa and was beached. She was a total loss.

=== 21 February ===
List of shipwrecks: 21 February 1930
Ship	State	Description
Alabama Maru	Japan	The cargo ship ran aground near Cape Inubō. She broke in two on 7 March and was a total loss.
Kohshun Maru	Japan	The cargo ship ran aground at the Scotch Cap Lighthouse, Unimak Island, Alaska, United States. She was a total loss.
Sembilan	Netherlands	The cargo ship collided with Halle (Germany) at Port Said, Egypt and was beached in the Suez Roads. She was refloated on 23 February.

=== 23 February ===
List of shipwrecks: 23 February 1930
Ship	State	Description
Batitu	Argentina	The tug collided with Vauban (United Kingdom) in the Point India Channel and sank. The crew were rescued by Vauban.

=== 25 February ===
List of shipwrecks: 25 February 1930
Ship	State	Description
Fofo	Greece	The cargo ship suffered an onboard explosion in the Mediterranean Sea and sank 40 nautical miles (74 km) north east of Oran, Algeria (36°10′N 0°02′W). All 22 crew were rescued by HMS Nelson (Royal Navy).

=== 27 February ===
List of shipwrecks: 27 February 1930
Ship	State	Description
HMCS Thiepval	Royal Canadian Navy	The Battle-class naval trawler struck an uncharted rock in Barkley Sound off the Broken Islands Group, British Columbia and was beached. She sank the next day. Her crew were rescued by HMCS Armentières (Royal Canadian Navy).

=== 28 February ===
List of shipwrecks: 28 February 1930
Ship	State	Description
Paling Maru	Japan	The cargo ship struck a rock on Namoa Island and was beached.
Perilia	United Kingdom	The fishing drifter went aground in fog on rocks at Milleur Point, Loch Ryan, Wigtownshire, Scotland and sank; the crew took to the ship's boat.

== March ==
=== 1 March ===
List of shipwrecks: 1 March 1930
Ship	State	Description
Shackleton	United Kingdom	The 133.5-foot (40.7 m) trawler ran aground on rocks in thick fog and heavy swells on Grannon Bo, Rathlin Island, Northern Ireland, U.K., a Total Loss. Crew rescued over a period of 11 hours by the Rathlin lifesaving crew.

=== 2 March ===
List of shipwrecks: 2 March 1930
Ship	State	Description
Kohlenimport	Germany	The cargo ship collided with Gudur (Sweden) in the North Sea off Terschelling, Netherlands and sank. The crew were rescued by Gudur.
Seantic	United States	The steamer was docked at the Alabo wharehouse dock, New Orleans in the Mississippi River when bales of cotton on the dock caught fire and spread to the ship so quickly the gangplank and lifeboat were unusable. Four crew, 3 women, and a child died.

=== 3 March ===
List of shipwrecks: 3 March 1930
Ship	State	Description
Cornwall	United Kingdom	The cargo ship ran aground on the south shore of Curaçao, Netherlands Antilles. She was refloated on 17 March.
Kindred Star	United Kingdom	The 91.9-foot (28.0 m), 115-ton steam drifter struck rocks off South Bishops Rock, Pembrokeshire and foundered after she was abandoned. The crew were rescued from her boat by Cheshire Coast (United Kingdom).
Ulf	Denmark	The cargo ship collided with Iceland (United Kingdom) in the North Sea off Norderney, Germany and sank. Her crew were rescued by Iceland.

=== 4 March ===
List of shipwrecks: 4 March 1930
Ship	State	Description
Fukuju Maru	Japan	The cargo ship was driven ashore at Shiriyasaki and was wrecked with the loss of all hands.

=== 5 March ===
List of shipwrecks: 5 March 1930
Ship	State	Description
Capable	United Kingdom	The coaster was driven ashore at Atherfield Point, Isle of Wight. All six crew were rescued. She was refloated on 13 March.
Mars	Latvia	The cargo ship ran aground at Ystad, Skåne County, Sweden. She was refloated on 13 March and found to be severely damaged.

=== 7 March ===
List of shipwrecks: 7 March 1930
Ship	State	Description
Manfred	Sweden	The coaster ran aground at Steabjerg. She was refloated on 18 March and found to be extensively damaged.
Tyne Maru	Japan	The cargo ship ran aground in the Kurushima Strait. She was refloated on 26 March.
Urajio Maru	Japan	The cargo ship ran aground in the Ryukyu Islands. She was refloated on 11 March.

=== 8 March ===
List of shipwrecks: 8 March 1930
Ship	State	Description
Lavinia M. Snow	United States	The four-masted schooner was driven ashore at Cape Hatteras, North Carolina and was wrecked.

=== 10 March ===
List of shipwrecks: 10 March 1930
Ship	State	Description
General Plumer	United Kingdom	The schooner departed Barbados for Port aux Basques, Newfoundland. No further trace, presumed foundered in the Atlantic Ocean with the loss of all hands.
Shimzu Maru	Japan	The cargo ship collided with Eurypylus (United Kingdom) in the Astraea Channel and was beached.

=== 11 March ===
List of shipwrecks: 11 March 1930
Ship	State	Description
Munaires	United States	The cargo ship was severely damaged at New Orleans, Louisiana when a dockside fire spread to the ship. Having sunk, she was refloated on 16 March.

=== 12 March ===
List of shipwrecks: 12 March 1930
Ship	State	Description
Geneva Kathleen	United States	The schooner was driven ashore in the Cayman Islands and was wrecked.

=== 14 March ===
List of shipwrecks: 14 March 1930
Ship	State	Description
Matemba	Belgium	The cargo ship was extensively damaged by fire at Antwerp.

=== 15 March ===
List of shipwrecks: 15 March 1930
Ship	State	Description
Ament	United Kingdom	The cargo ship ran aground in the North Sea off the Longsands Lightship (United Kingdom) and broke up. Her crew were rescued by Train Ferry No.2 (United Kingdom).

=== 17 March ===
List of shipwrecks: 17 March 1930
Ship	State	Description
Blijdendijk	Netherlands	The cargo ship caught fire at Suez, Egypt and was abandoned by her crew.

=== 18 March ===
List of shipwrecks: 18 March 1930
Ship	State	Description
Sprat	United States	Under tow on a voyage from Juneau to Wrangell in the waters of Southeast Alaska with no people or cargo aboard, the 27-gross register ton, 52.8-foot (16.1 m) scow sank without loss of life 7 nautical miles (13 km; 8.1 mi) south of Point Hugh (57°34′10″N 133°48′30″W) in the Territory of Alaska.

=== 20 March ===
List of shipwrecks: 20 March 1930
Ship	State	Description
Nils	Norway	The cargo ship ran aground on Sable Island, Nova Scotia, Canada. She was declared a total loss on 26 March.

=== 21 March ===
List of shipwrecks: 21 March 1930
Ship	State	Description
Titoki	United Kingdom	The cargo ship ran aground at Motucka, South Island, New Zealand. She was refloated on 28 March.

=== 26 March ===
List of shipwrecks: 26 March 1930
Ship	State	Description
Panama	United States	The 51-gross register ton 68.7-foot (20.9 m) fishing vessel was wrecked on a reef off Marmot Island in the Kodiak Archipelago in a snowstorm with heavy seas and broke up in the surf. Her nine-man crew made it to the island in dories and spent 36 hours there, then reached Ouzinkie on Spruce Island in the dories.

=== 27 March ===
List of shipwrecks: 27 March 1930
Ship	State	Description
Secundus	Germany	The galiot sank off Falsterbo, Sweden. The crew were rescued.
Wheatplain	United Kingdom	The coaster ran aground on Tory Island, County Donegal, Ireland and was wrecked. Her crew were rescued. She broke in three during a gale on 29 March.

=== 28 March ===
List of shipwrecks: 28 March 1930
Ship	State	Description
Kirsten B	Norway	The cargo ship ran aground off Farsund, Norway. She later broke in two, with the stern section sinking.

=== 29 March ===
List of shipwrecks: 29 March 1930
Ship	State	Description
Ben Doran	United Kingdom	The vessel went aground on the Ve Skerries, Shetland, deemed to have done so through because of poor visibility. Despite rescue efforts made by Arora and Smiling Morn, the full crew of at least seven were lost with the severity of the weather.
Kosai Maru	Japan	The cargo ship ran aground at Kungtungtau, China and was abandoned in a sinking condition.
HMS L1	Royal Navy	The L-class submarine parted her tow and came ashore at Cape Cornwall, Cornwall.
Rambler	United Kingdom	The auxiliary schooner was driven ashore in Glasserton Bay and was wrecked. Her crew survived.
Rhine Maru	Japan	The cargo ship was driven ashore at Point Sur, California, United States. Her crew were rescued. She was declared a total loss on 16 April.

=== 30 March ===
List of shipwrecks: 30 March 1930
Ship	State	Description
Königstein	Germany	The cargo ship ran aground at Varberg, Halland County, Sweden. She was refloated on 7 April.

== April ==
=== 2 April ===
List of shipwrecks: 2 April 1930
Ship	State	Description
Miguel de Cervantes	Spanish Navy	The Almirante Cervera-class cruiser broke free from her moorings at Ferrol, Galicia. She collided with the quayside and sank. She was refloated the next day. Later repaired and returned to service.
Shespoikrabolov	Soviet Union	The cargo ship ran aground off Chōsi, Chiba, Japan. Salvage efforts were abandoned on 5 April.

=== 3 April ===
List of shipwrecks: 3 April 1930
Ship	State	Description
Persiano	Italy	The cargo ship ran aground at Bokalikale, Turkey. She was refloated on 6 April.

=== 4 April ===
List of shipwrecks: 4 April 1930
Ship	State	Description
Ballena	Chile	The cargo ship was wrecked at Cape Chimpel.

=== 5 April ===
List of shipwrecks: 5 April 1930
Ship	State	Description
Paradigm	Sweden	The cargo ship ran aground in the Lessoe Channel. The crew were rescued by Kattegat (Denmark).

=== 6 April ===
List of shipwrecks: 6 April 1930
Ship	State	Description
Cogandale	United Kingdom	The cargo ship sank at Eastern Gut, India. The crew were rescued.

=== 8 April ===
List of shipwrecks: 8 April 1930
Ship	State	Description
Colbert	France	The cargo ship ran aground at Alexandria, Egypt. She was refloated on 15 April.
General	United States	The tug sank at Detour Township, Michigan and was declared a total loss.

=== 10 April ===
List of shipwrecks: 10 April 1930
Ship	State	Description
Lila E. D. Young	United Kingdom	The schooner sprang a leak in the Atlantic Ocean off the coast of Portugal (40°00′N 9°40′W). She was abandoned and set on fire. The crew were rescued by Freixall (flag unknown).
St. Sunniva	United Kingdom	The ferry ran aground on Mousa, Shetland Islands and was wrecked. All on board were rescued.

=== 11 April ===
List of shipwrecks: 11 April 1930
Ship	State	Description
Benjamin C. Smith	United Kingdom	The schooner was abandoned in the Atlantic Ocean off the coast of Nova Scotia, Canada. The crew were rescued.
City of Pekin	United Kingdom	The cargo ship struck a submerged rock and sank off Brookes Island, Port Hamilton, Korea. The crew were rescued.
Mazeppa	United Kingdom	The Thames barge collided with Steingrim (Norway) in the North Sea off the Kentish Knock Lightship (United Kingdom). All five crew were rescued by the Walton-on-the-Naze Lifeboat.

=== 15 April ===
List of shipwrecks: 15 April 1930
Ship	State	Description
K. C. Gorden	United Kingdom	The schooner caught fire off St. John's, Newfoundland and was a total loss. The crew were rescued.
Tiziano	Italy	The cargo ship came ashore at Mazzara, Sicily. She was refloated on 18 April.

=== 17 April ===
List of shipwrecks: 17 April 1930
Ship	State	Description
Christos Sigalas	Greece	The 291-foot (89 m), 2,211-ton cargo vessel was abandoned by her crew 500 miles (800 km) southeast of Cape Hatteras (32°22′N 96°22′W). The crew were rescued by Monfiore (Italy).
Diamond C	United States	The 14-gross register ton motor vessel caught fire and exploded while refueling at Wrangell, Territory of Alaska. Her two-man crew survived.

=== 20 April ===
List of shipwrecks: 20 April 1930
Ship	State	Description
Kamiyoshi Maru	Japan	The cargo ship ran aground and sank off Swatow, China.
Michalis Pontos	Greece	The cargo ship ran aground off Penarth Head, Glamorgan, United Kingdom. She was refloated on 24 April.
Nisshin Maru No.2	Japan	The cargo ship ran aground on Okujiri Island and was a total loss. The crew were rescued.

=== 22 April ===
List of shipwrecks: 22 April 1930
Ship	State	Description
Vera E. Himmelman	United Kingdom	The schooner sprang a leak in the Atlantic Ocean off North Sydney, Nova Scotia, Canada and was abandoned.

=== 23 April ===
List of shipwrecks: 23 April 1930
Ship	State	Description
Famalicao Terceiro	Portugal	The schooner was discovered abandoned in the Atlantic Ocean (approximately 41°N 9°W).
Federico Garolla	Italy	The cargo ship suffered an explosion of her boilers and sank in the Ionian Sea between Zakynthos and Kephalonia with the loss of twenty of her 23 crew.

=== 24 April ===
List of shipwrecks: 24 April 1930
Ship	State	Description
Thames	United States	The 142-foot (43 m), 540-gross register ton steamer, a cargo ship, was beached off Sound Beach on Captain's Island, Long Island Sound off Norwalk, Connecticut, and burned to the waterline. Her crew abandoned ship in two lifeboats, which quickly were swamped in heavy seas. Sources differ on the size of her crew and the number of survivors: She either had a crew of 26 of which 16 died, or a crew of 16 of which six died.

=== 25 April ===
List of shipwrecks: 25 April 1930
Ship	State	Description
Margit	Sweden	The auxiliary three-masted schooner ran aground near Lysekil, Västra Götaland County and sank. She was raised on 7 May.

=== 26 April ===
List of shipwrecks: 26 April 1930
Ship	State	Description
Kirkwood	United Kingdom	The collier was rammed and sunk in the North Sea off the Elbe No.1 Lightship (Germany) by President Harding (United States) with the loss of a crew member. The survivors were rescued by President Harding.

=== 28 April ===
List of shipwrecks: 28 April 1930
Ship	State	Description
Rosa	United Kingdom	The Admiralty fuelling craft ran aground at Flamborough Head, Yorkshire and was wrecked. All sixteen crew were rescued by the Flamborough Lifeboat.

=== 29 April ===
List of shipwrecks: 29 April 1930
Ship	State	Description
Gairsoppa	United Kingdom	The cargo ship ran aground at Fulton Point, India. She was refloated later that day.

=== 30 April ===
List of shipwrecks: 30 April 1930
Ship	State	Description
Luzon Maru	Japan	The cargo ship ran aground at Inuboye-saki. She broke in two, sank, and was declared a total loss.
Westerner	United States	The cargo ship ran aground at Ak-bash-liman, Turkey. She was refloated on 9 May.

=== Unknown date ===
List of shipwrecks: Unknown date 1930
Ship	State	Description
Omaney	United States	The halibut schooner was wrecked on Sitkinak Island in the Kodiak Archipelago

== May ==
=== 2 May ===
List of shipwrecks: 2 May 1930
Ship	State	Description
Jessie	Italy	The cargo ship foundered in the Mediterranean Sea off Misrata, Libya.
Raven	United Kingdom	The cargo ship collided with Cleopatra (Greece) in the North Sea (53°52′N 6°50′E) and sank. The crew were rescued by Cleopatra.

=== 7 May ===
List of shipwrecks: 7 May 1930
Ship	State	Description
Katiesau	Honduras	The auxiliary schooner collided with Copan (Honduras) in the Caribbean Sea 5 nautical miles (9.3 km) east of Puerto Cortés and sank.

=== 8 May ===
List of shipwrecks: 8 May 1930
Ship	State	Description
Richfield	United States	The tanker was driven ashore at Drake's Bay, California. The crew were rescued.

=== 9 May ===
List of shipwrecks: 9 May 1930
Ship	State	Description
Teddy H	United States	The 153-gross register ton, 74.3-foot (22.6 m) sternwheel paddle steamer, in operation as a cargo ship, was crushed by ice on the Tanana River 0.5-mile (0.80 km) above Nenana in the Territory of Alaska when an ice jam upriver from her broke free during the spring thaw, came downstream, and broke her apart. Her crew of 13 survived.

=== 11 May ===
List of shipwrecks: 11 May 1930
Ship	State	Description
Twins	United States	During a voyage in the Territory of Alaska from Cordova to Cape Hinchinbrook, the 11-gross register ton 35.9-foot (10.9 m) fishing vessel dragged her anchors, drifted onto Montague Island at the entrance to Prince William Sound, and was wrecked with no one aboard after her three occupants left her in a skiff which capsized as they tried to reach shore, killing one of them. With the skiff overturned, the two survivors were unable to return to Twins to save her from drifting ashore.

=== 12 May ===
List of shipwrecks: 12 May 1930
Ship	State	Description
Prima	United Kingdom	The dredger capsized in the English Channel off the Owers Lightship (United Kingdom).
Zia	Turkey	The cargo ship caught fire in the Mediterranean Sea (approximately 37°N 26°E) and was abandoned by her crew.

=== 13 May ===
List of shipwrecks: 13 May 1930
Ship	State	Description
Remenham	United Kingdom	The cargo ship struck a submerged object in the Baltic Sea (54°30′N 11°40′E) and was holed. She was beached on the south coast of Falster, Denmark. She was refloated the next day.

=== 15 May ===
List of shipwrecks: 15 May 1930
Ship	State	Description
Azua	United States	The schooner collided with City of Atlanta (United States) in the Atlantic Ocean 47 nautical miles (87 km) south south east of the Barnegat Lighthouse, New Jersey.
Motau	United Kingdom	The auxiliary schooner foundered in the Pacific Ocean off Suva, fiji.
Principe de Asturias	Spain	The cargo ship foundered in the Atlantic Ocean off Fernando Pó, French West Africa during a cyclone. The crew survived.

=== 17 May ===
List of shipwrecks: 17 May 1930
Ship	State	Description
Icarahy	Brazil	The cargo ship collided with the breakwater at Rio Grande do Norte and sank with the loss of seven crew.
Isobel Moore	United Kingdom	The schooner ran aground in Danzig Cove, Newfoundland and was a total loss. The crew survived.

=== 18 May ===
List of shipwrecks: 18 May 1930
Ship	State	Description
Josina	Spain	The cargo ship ran aground on Île d'Aix, Charente-Maritime, France, at the mouth of the Charente. She was refloated on 23 May.
Yonan Maru	Japan	The cargo ship was severely damaged by fire at Singapore.

=== 19 May ===
List of shipwrecks: 19 May 1930
Ship	State	Description
Maria S. Kastanou	Greece	The cargo ship ran aground at Carrumeiro Vejo, Spain. She was declared a total loss on 22 May.

=== 20 May ===
List of shipwrecks: 20 May 1930
Ship	State	Description
John G Watson	United Kingdom	The fishing trawler, under tow of tug Lynx from Aberdeen to Grimsby for repairs following a stranding, began leaking five miles north-east of the Longstone lighthouse, off the Northumberland coast and the six riding crew were taken off. Soon after, the trawler suddenly capsized and sank.

=== 21 May ===
List of shipwrecks: 21 May 1930
Ship	State	Description
Asia	France	The passenger ship caught fire at Jeddah, Nejd and Hejaz and was abandoned with the loss of about 100 lives. She was declared a total loss.
Portgwarra	United Kingdom	The cargo ship came ashore at Castle Island, Bermuda. She was refloated on 26 May.

=== 22 May ===
List of shipwrecks: 22 May 1930
Ship	State	Description
Eleftheria	Greece	The cargo ship foundered in the Aegean Sea off Skiathos.
Maria Adelia	Portugal	The cargo ship was destroyed by fire at Melilla, Spain.

=== 23 May ===
List of shipwrecks: 23 May 1930
Ship	State	Description
Archiduc Rodolphe	Belgium	The cargo ship ran aground on Lissa Island, Yugoslavia and was wrecked.
Normand	France	The cargo ship sank at Buncrana, County Donegal, Ireland.

=== 25 May ===
List of shipwrecks: 25 May 1930
Ship	State	Description
City of Honolulu	United States	The ocean liner caught fire, burned out and sank in Honolulu Harbour, Territory of Hawaii. She was raised on 9 June, patched up and sailed to Los Angeles, California, where she was declared a constructive total loss. City of Honolulu was scrapped at Osaka, Japan in December 1933.
St. Croix	United Kingdom	The tug ran aground 6 nautical miles (11 km) north of Walvis Bay, South Africa and was wrecked. The crew were rescued.

=== 28 May ===
List of shipwrecks: 28 May 1930
Ship	State	Description
Kruisschans	Belgium	The cargo ship struck a submerged object and sank in the English Channel, 20 nautical miles (37 km) west of Beachy Head, Sussex, United Kingdom. The crew were rescued by the trawler D.L.C. (United Kingdom).
Rimula	United Kingdom	The cargo ship ran aground on the south shore of Curaçao, Netherlands Antilles. Her crew were rescued. She was refloated on 16 June.

=== 30 May ===
List of shipwrecks: 30 May 1930
Ship	State	Description
Taihoku Maru	Japan	The cargo ship ran aground and sank in the Chanjiku Channel, Korea.

== June ==
=== 1 June ===
List of shipwrecks: 1 June 1930
Ship	State	Description
Dreadnaught	United States	The 8-gross register ton motor vessel sank in Southeast Alaska at a location described by her captain as the "other side Kletachekoff Island, near Leo's Anchorage, Chichagoff Island," probably a reference to Klokachef Island (57.4114°N 135.8897°W) opposite Leo Anchorage (57.4222°N 135.8631°W) on Chichagof Island in the Alexander Archipelago. The two people aboard survived.
Inger	Sweden	The cargo ship collided with Literno (Italy) in the English Channel 7 nautical miles (13 km) south west of Beachy Head, Sussex, United Kingdom and sank with the loss of fifteen of her eighteen crew. Survivors were rescued by Literno and the Eastbourne Lifeboat.

=== 6 June ===
List of shipwrecks: 6 June 1930
Ship	State	Description
Arpha	United Kingdom	The yacht ran aground in Moon Sound. She was refloated on 10 June.
Chang Wo	United Kingdom	The cargo ship ran aground in Tungting Lake, China. She was refloated on 10 June.

=== 8 June ===
List of shipwrecks: 8 June 1930
Ship	State	Description
Buenos Aires Maru	Japan	The cargo ship collided with Kalinin (Soviet Union) at Montevideo, Uruguay and was beached.
Masula	United Kingdom	The cargo ship arrived at Gibraltar with her cargo on fire. She was beached the next day. The fire was extinguished on 11 June, and she was refloated on 23 June.

=== 10 June ===
List of shipwrecks: 10 June 1930
Ship	State	Description
Pinthis	United States	Carrying a cargo of gasoline, the 1,111-gross register ton coastal tanker collided in thick fog with the passenger ship Fairfax (United States) in the Atlantic Ocean off Fourth Cliff at Scituate, Massachusetts. She caught fire, exploded and subsequently capsized and sank in up to 100 feet (30 m) of water 6 nautical miles (11 km; 6.9 mi) east of Fourth Cliff at 42°09′18″N 070°33′48″W with the loss of her entire crew (either 19 or 20 people). Seventeen crew and 14 passengers on board Fairfax also were killed.

=== 11 June ===
List of shipwrecks: 11 June 1930
Ship	State	Description
Dorothy M. Smart	United Kingdom	The schooner foundered in the Atlantic Ocean off Cape Breton, Nova Scotia.

=== 13 June ===
List of shipwrecks: 13 June 1930
Ship	State	Description
Miss England II	United Kingdom	The speedboat struck a floating tree branch in Windermere during a world speed record attempt. She capsized and sank, killing Sir Henry Segrave and injuring the other two crew.
Muroran Maru	Japan	The cargo ship came ashore on the Kamchatka Peninsula, Soviet Union and was abandoned by her crew.

=== 16 June ===
List of shipwrecks: 16 June 1930
Ship	State	Description
Thirlby	United Kingdom	The cargo ship ran aground on a reef 7 nautical miles (13 km) west of Puerto Padre, Cuba. She was refloated on 23 June.

=== 17 June ===
List of shipwrecks: 17 June 1930
Ship	State	Description
Dimitrios M. Diacakis	Greece	The cargo ship ran aground at Akbashliman, Turkey. She was refloated on 24 June.
N.A.F.	United Kingdom	The schooner was wrecked in Bay St. George, Newfoundland. Her crew were rescued.
Sea Belle II	Straits Settlements	The governor's yacht run aground on a reef or rock ledge off the Perhentian Islands, Kelantan. Refloated on 21 June, repaired, and returned to service.
Sulby	United Kingdom	The 287-ton steam trawler had a carbide drum fall into the engine crankcase and explode. She was beached at Fleetwood. Refloated, repaired, and returned to service.

=== 18 June ===
List of shipwrecks: 18 June 1930
Ship	State	Description
Aberdonian	United Kingdom	The passenger ship ran aground at Staithes, Yorkshire. Her 55 passengers were taken off by a tug. She was refloated on 22 June.

=== 19 June ===
List of shipwrecks: 19 June 1930
Ship	State	Description
Baltic	United Kingdom	The four-masted schooner struck rocks in Penrhos Bay and capsized. All five people on board survived.

=== 20 June ===
List of shipwrecks: 20 June 1930
Ship	State	Description
Towy	United Kingdom	The coaster grounded on rocks when leaving Portstewart, Northern Ireland for Irvine, Scotland in ballast. She was refloated on 26 June by tug Milewater and towed towards Portrush, but foundered one mile from Portrush harbour.

=== 21 June ===
List of shipwrecks: 21 June 1930
Ship	State	Description
Keishin Maru	Japan	The cargo ship ran aground at Keelung, China. She was refloated on 25 June.
Towy	United Kingdom	The coaster ran aground at Portstewart, County Londonderry. She was refloated on 26 June and taken under tow with the intention of reaching Portrush but she capsized and sank. All crew were rescued.

=== 23 June ===
List of shipwrecks: 23 June 1930
Ship	State	Description
Casablanca	Germany	The cargo ship was in collision with Henry Stanley (United Kingdom) in the English Channel (49°36′N 3°00′W) and sank. All 27 people on board were rescued by Henry Stanley.

=== 24 June ===
List of shipwrecks: 24 June 1930
Ship	State	Description
Daian Maru	Japan	The cargo ship ran aground at Cape Patience, Sakhalin, Soviet Union. Salvage efforts were abandoned on 28 June and she was declared a total loss.

=== 25 June ===
List of shipwrecks: 25 June 1930
Ship	State	Description
Mary G. Maynard	United States	The schooner was abandoned in the Atlantic Ocean. Her crew were rescued by Evina (Norway). She was later reported derelict at 38°33′N 59°25′W by Maindy Grange (United Kingdom).

=== 26 June ===
List of shipwrecks: 26 June 1930
Ship	State	Description
John B. King	Canada	The scow exploded and sank in the St. Lawrence Seaway near Brockville, Ontario, Canada, when lightning struck her, detonating dynamite she had on board. Thirty of her crew were killed; the 12 survivors were rescued by the United States Coast Guard Cutter CGQ-II.
Niigata Maru	Japan	The cargo ship ran aground in the Oki Islands. She was refloated on 4 July.

=== 30 June ===
List of shipwrecks: 30 June 1930
Ship	State	Description
Frida	Germany	The cargo ship ran aground on Saaremaa, Estonia. Her crew were rescued.

=== Unknown date ===
List of shipwrecks: Unknown date June 1930
Ship	State	Description
Equity	United Kingdom	The cargo ship ran aground at Alderney in the Channel Islands. Although partially swamped, she was salvaged.

== July ==
=== 1 July ===
List of shipwrecks: 1 July 1930
Ship	State	Description
Koyo Maru	Japan	The cargo ship came ashore on Sakhalin, Soviet Union. She was refloated on 6 July.
Kurdistan	United Kingdom	The cargo ship came ashore in the Molyneux Sound. She was refloated on 6 July.
Moritz	United States	As a means of disposal, the retired 3,500-gross register ton cargo ship was partially burned and then scuttled in approximately 200 feet (61 m) of water 5 nautical miles (9.3 km) east of Halfway Rock off Marblehead, Massachusetts, at 42.504261°N 070.65504°W.

=== 2 July ===
List of shipwrecks: 1 July 1930
Ship	State	Description
Mona	Isle of Man	Mona The packet steamer ran aground on the Conister Rock in Douglas Harbour, Isle of Man. She later was refloated, repaired, and returned to service.

=== 4 July ===
List of shipwrecks: 4 July 1930
Ship	State	Description
Knight of the Realm	United Kingdom	The cargo ship ran aground in the Paraná River 10 nautical miles (19 km) upstream of Rosario, Santa Fe, Argentina. She was refloated on 11 July.

=== 6 July ===
List of shipwrecks: 6 July 1930
Ship	State	Description
Karagjorgje	Yugoslavia	The passenger ship collided with Francesco Morosini (Italy) off Pašman with the loss of four lives. She was beached and all passengers were taken off by Francesco Morosini.

=== 7 July ===
List of shipwrecks: 7 July 1930
Ship	State	Description
Dampto	Norway	The cargo ship collided with Hoten Maru (Japan) off the Shandong Promontory, China and sank. Her crew was rescued.

=== 8 July ===
List of shipwrecks: 8 July 1930
Ship	State	Description
Greypoint	Nicaragua	The cargo ship caught fire at Twelve Mile Island, Alabama, United States. She was a constructive total loss.
Iwai Maru	Japan	The cargo ship ran aground off Notorosaki. She was refloated on 12 July.
Mac Hinery	United Kingdom	The cargo ship foundered in the Atlantic Ocean off Cape Breton Island, Nova Scotia, Canada.

=== 10 July ===
List of shipwrecks: 10 July 1930
Ship	State	Description
Dolores	Spain	The auxiliary schooner foundered in the Mediterranean Sea off Portsay. Her crew survived.
Yorkton	United Kingdom	The cargo ship collided with Mantadoc (United Kingdom) in Whitefish Bay and sank. She was refloated on 9 August.

=== 11 July ===
List of shipwrecks: 11 July 1930
Ship	State	Description
Clara Blanche	United States	The 15-gross register ton purse seiner was destroyed by fire in port at Tyee, Territory of Alaska. Her crew of four survived.
Evangeline	United States	The cargo ship suffered an onboard explosion at Rockaway Point, New York. She was beached in the Rockaway Inlet and was destroyed by the subsequent fire.
Lauretta Frances	United Kingdom	The schooner sprang a leak and foundered in the Atlantic Ocean 15 nautical miles (28 km) off Cape Anguille, Newfoundland. The crew survived.

=== 12 July ===
List of shipwrecks: 12 July 1930
Ship	State	Description
Ascot	United Kingdom	The cargo ship ran aground in the Paraná River at Borghi, Argentina. She was refloated on 15 July.
Turuna	Portugal	The three-masted schooner was abandoned in the Atlantic Ocean (44°30′N 60°55′W). She was set on fire by her crew, who were rescued by Coiborno (flag unknown).

=== 14 July ===
List of shipwrecks: 14 July 1930
Ship	State	Description
Fawn	United Kingdom	The coaster struck a rock off Portnahaven, Islay and was beached. She was refloated on 18 July.
Kohatsu Maru	Japan	The cargo ship collided with Aeneas (United Kingdom) in the East China Sea off Cape Shantung, China and sank.
Pengreep	United Kingdom	The cargo ship ran aground in the Paraná River 25 nautical miles (46 km) downstream of Rosario, Argentina. She was refloated on 18 July.

=== 18 July ===
List of shipwrecks: 18 July 1930
Ship	State	Description
El Hurd	United States	The 39-gross register ton, 60.3-foot (18.4 m) motor schooner was stranded in Chichagof Bay (55°39′N 160°14′W) on the south coast of the Alaska Peninsula in the Territory of Alaska. Her crew of five survived. She was refloated a few days later, but her damage was discovered to be so severe that she was declared a total loss.

=== 19 July ===
List of shipwrecks: 19 July 1930
Ship	State	Description
Aikoku Maru	Japan	The cargo ship sank at Nagasaki during a typhoon.
Kalypso Vergotti	Greece	The cargo ship ran aground on the English Bank off Uruguay. She was refloated on 1 August.
Ryohi Maru	Japan	The cargo ship sank at Nagasaki during a typhoon.
Targis	Germany	The cargo liner caught fire in the Atlantic Ocean and foundered (33°45′N 50°45′W). All on board were rescued by Rangitata (United Kingdom).

=== 21 July ===
List of shipwrecks: 21 July 1930
Ship	State	Description
Adele Traber	Germany	The cargo ship ran aground near the Pevna Lighthouse, Oulu, Finland. She was refloated on 24 July.
North Pacific	United Kingdom	The cargo ship ran aground in the Paraná River at Arroyo Seco, Santa Fe, Argentina. She was refloated on 25 July.

=== 22 July ===
List of shipwrecks: 22 July 1930
Ship	State	Description
Anna Barron	United States	The 82-gross register ton steam cannery tender was stranded on rocks while trying to moor to a dolphin off Ansley Point (58°12′30″N 135°07′10″W) in Icy Strait in the Alexander Archipelago in Southeast Alaska. Her crew of seven survived, but she was deemed a total loss.
Saint Hilda	United States	The dredger struck a submerged object and foundered at Tampico, Tamaulipas, Mexico, with the loss of two crew.

=== 23 July ===
List of shipwrecks: 23 July 1930
Ship	State	Description
Dustu	France	The schooner struck a rock in the Bay of Biscay 5 nautical miles (9.3 km) off Lochtudy, Finistère and foundered.
Raymond	Belgium	The coaster ran aground at Warkworth, Northumberland, United Kingdom. She was refloated on 29 July.

=== 28 July ===
List of shipwrecks: 28 July 1930
Ship	State	Description
Kronprins Gustav Adolf	Sweden	The cargo ship caught fire in the Atlantic Ocean 82 nautical miles (152 km) off Vitória, Brazil. She was consequently abandoned 14 nautical miles (26 km) south east of the Rio Doce Lighthouse. The crew were rescued by Alphacea (Netherlands) and Vandyck (United Kingdom). She drifted ashore 60 nautical miles (110 km) north of Vitória and was a total loss.

=== 29 July ===
List of shipwrecks: 29 July 1930
Ship	State	Description
George J. Whalen	United States	The dredger foundered in Lake Erie six miles (9.7 km) off of Dunkirk, New York, 23 miles (37 km) east of Presque Isle. 15 crew were killed.
Twin B	United States	The 9-gross register ton, 40-foot (12 m) fishing vessel was destroyed by fire while departing Port Althorp, Territory of Alaska. Her three-man crew survived.

=== 30 July ===
List of shipwrecks: 30 July 1930
Ship	State	Description
Biyo Maru	Japan	The cargo ship ran aground off the Shiriyazaki Lighthouse, Honshu. She was refloated on 24 August.
Heijun Maru	Japan	The cargo ship ran aground off the Shiriyazaki Lighthouse. She was refloated on 19 August.

=== 31 July ===
List of shipwrecks: 31 July 1930
Ship	State	Description
Nerbudda	United Kingdom	The cargo ship collided with Legazpi (Spain) in the Atlantic Ocean (36°22′N 3°24′W) and was holed. She was taken in tow by Nankin (United Kingdom) and beached at Castle Ferro, Spain. Nerbudda was refloated on 4 August and towed to Gibraltar.

=== Unknown date ===
List of shipwrecks: unknown date July 1930
Ship	State	Description
Cretefarm	Spain	The 180-foot (55 m) concrete barge was sunk at Candás harbour in Asturias, Spain, sometime in July.

== August ==
=== 1 August ===
List of shipwrecks: 1 August 1930
Ship	State	Description
Eastborough	United Kingdom	The cargo ship ran aground in the Paraná River, Argentina. She was refloated on 7 August.
Feltore	United States	The cargo ship ran aground at Cruz Grande, Mexico and was abandoned.

=== 2 August ===
List of shipwrecks: 2 August 1930
Ship	State	Description
Thyland	Germany	The cargo ship collided with Hedwigshütte (Germany) in the Kaiser Wilhelm Canal and was beached.

=== 3 August ===
List of shipwrecks: 3 August 1930
Ship	State	Description
Akashi	Imperial Japanese Navy	The decommissioned coast defense ship was sunk as a target by Imperial Japanese Navy dive bombers in the Pacific Ocean south of Izu Ōshima.

=== 7 August ===
List of shipwrecks: 7 August 1930
Ship	State	Description
August Thyssen	Germany	The cargo ship came ashore at Alligator Pond, Jamaica. She was refloated on 10 August.
Svea	Estonia	The sailing ship collided with Jupiter (Estonia) at Stockholm, Sweden and sank with the loss of a crew member.
Tregenna	United Kingdom	The cargo ship ran aground at San Pedro de Macorís, Dominican Republic. She was refloated on 15 August.

=== 8 August ===
List of shipwrecks: 8 August 1930
Ship	State	Description
Avgy	Greece	The cargo ship caught fire in the Atlantic Ocean and put into Leixões, Portugal and was beached. She was refloated on 29 August.
Hochelaga	United Kingdom	The cargo ship was beached on one of the Magdalen Islands, Quebec, Canada having previously run aground in the Bird Islands, Northwest Territories. Following storm damage on August 18, she was a total loss.

=== 9 August ===
List of shipwrecks: 9 August 1930
Ship	State	Description
Sir Stafford Northcote	United Kingdom	The cargo ship collided with City of London (United Kingdom) in the River Thames and sank.

=== 10 August ===
List of shipwrecks: 10 August 1930
Ship	State	Description
Caribou	United Kingdom	The passenger ship ran aground on Muse Island, Newfoundland. All passengers and crew took to the lifeboats. She was a total loss.

=== 12 August ===
List of shipwrecks: 12 August 1930
Ship	State	Description
Baltic	Danzig	The tanker ran aground at Punta Indio, Argentina. She was refloated on 16 August.
Dalila	France	The cargo ship ran aground in the Charente at Tonnay-Charente, Charente-Maritime.
Halley's Comet	United Kingdom	The schooner foundered off Bell Island, Newfoundland.
Taitsu Maru	Japan	The cargo ship ran aground at Urusan, Korea. She was still aground on 22 October.

=== 13 August ===
List of shipwrecks: 13 August 1930
Ship	State	Description
Go Get	United States	The 29-gross register ton motor vessel was destroyed by fire while docked at the Kukak Bay Cannery on the south coast of the Alaska Peninsula in the Territory of Alaska. Her crew of four survived.
Ryuho Maru No.1	Japan	The cargo ship ran aground at Lopatka, Soviet Union. She was refloated on 29 August.

=== 15 August ===
List of shipwrecks: 15 August 1930
Ship	State	Description
Verna	United States	The 9-gross register ton 32.3-foot (9.8 m) fishing vessel was destroyed by fire in the Territory of Alaska at a place identified in contemporary accounts as "Point Rosalie," possibly a reference to Point Saint Rosalia (55°34′15″N 133°24′45″W).

=== 17 August ===
List of shipwrecks: 16 August 1930
Ship	State	Description
Angele	France	The sailing ship departed Cardiff, Glamorgan, United Kingdom for Pont-l'Abbé, Finistère. No further trace, presumed foundered with the loss of all hands.
Tahiti	United Kingdom	Tahiti sinking. The ocean liner sank at position 24°44′S 166°15′W due to damage she incurred on 15 August when her starboard propeller shaft fractured in the Pacific Ocean (460 nautical miles, 850 km, 530 mi) off Rarotonga, Cook Islands, at position 26°43′S 166°16′W, holing her hull. All 128 passengers and 148 crew were rescued by the steamer Ventura (United States).

=== 18 August ===
List of shipwrecks: 18 August 1930
Ship	State	Description
Brilliant	United States	The coastal tanker suffered an onboard explosion and fire at Jacksonville, Florida and was a constructive total loss. Five crew were killed.

=== 21 August ===
List of shipwrecks: 21 August 1930
Ship	State	Description
Ba	Norway	The cargo ship struck rocks at Guardiana, Portugal and sank. Her crew were rescued.
Izaro	Spain	The cargo ship struck a rock and sank in the Mediterranean Sea off Cape Palos, Murcia.
Saxon	United Kingdom	The 120.4-foot (36.7 m), 239.34-ton steam trawler was wrecked in a gale on Hough Skerries. She broke up between 22–25 August in heavy swells, a total loss. The crew rowed 5 miles (8.0 km) to shore in her boat to Tiree beach.
Tami Maru	Japan	The cargo ship ran aground on the Shiretoko Peninsula. She was refloated on 31 August.

=== 22 August ===
List of shipwrecks: 22 August 1930
Ship	State	Description
Mitchell	United States	The 14-gross register ton motor vessel was stranded in fog on a reef off Fannie Island (58°02′45″N 133°47′10″W) in Southeast Alaska, then destroyed by a fire that broke out during an attempt to refloat her. The only person on board survived.

=== 23 August ===
List of shipwrecks: 23 August 1930
Ship	State	Description
Guine	Portugal	The cargo ship was wrecked at Bissau, Portuguese Guinea.

=== 26 August ===
List of shipwrecks: 26 August 1930
Ship	State	Description
Daring	United Kingdom	The tug caught fire and sank in the Pacific Ocean off Vancouver Island, Canada with the loss of six crew.

=== 27 August ===
List of shipwrecks: 27 August 1930
Ship	State	Description
Argentum	United Kingdom	The cargo ship ran aground at Nairn. She was refloated on 23 September.
Spica	Norway	The cargo ship ran aground on the Cerebus Shoal in the Strait of Canso. She was declared a total loss on 10 September.

=== 28 August ===
List of shipwrecks: 28 August 1930
Ship	State	Description
Neches	United States	The cargo ship collided with a scow off the Coney Island Lighthouse, New York Harbor and sank, as did the scow.
Starck	Sweden	The cargo ship ran aground at Ulkogrunni, Finland and was beached. She was refloated on 4 September.

=== 31 August ===
List of shipwrecks: 31 August 1930
Ship	State	Description
Claretta	United Kingdom	The coaster collided with Borderland (United Kingdom) in the Atlantic Ocean 11 nautical miles (20 km) of the Longships Lighthouse and sank. Her crew were rescued by Borderland.
Maroussio	Greece	The cargo ship ran aground at Injeh Burno, Turkey.
Shoreham	United Kingdom	The coaster was in collision with Annik (France) in the Atlantic Ocean 5 nautical miles (9.3 km) off Trevose Head, Cornwall and sank. Her crew were rescued by Annik.

== September ==
=== 1 September ===
List of shipwrecks: 1 September 1930
Ship	State	Description
Fort Union	United States	Suffering from a rotten hull, the 2,654-ton, 267-foot (81.4 m) barge was beached deliberately for salvage purposes at Ship's Cove (56°15′20″N 134°39′45″W) at Port Conclusion (56.2669°N 134.6623°W) in Southeast Alaska. She subsequently was scrapped in situ.
Orient	United States	The fishing vessel was sunk in a collision with Admiral Nulton (United States) one-half mile (0.80 km) north north west of Sisters Island light, British Columbia. Ten killed.
Sunset	United States	During a voyage in the Kodiak Archipelago from Perenosa Bay (58.4307°N 152.4173°W) on Afognak Island to Uyak Bay (57.8000°N 154.0667°W) on Kodiak Island with a crew of three and a cargo of 15 tons of silver salmon, the 35-gross register ton, 56.3-foot (17.2 m) fishing vessel was wrecked without loss of life in Litnik Bay (58°01′30″N 152°44′00″W) on the coast of Afognak Island.

=== 2 September ===
List of shipwrecks: 2 September 1930
Ship	State	Description
St. Christophe	United Kingdom	The cargo ship was wrecked at Los Roques, Venezuela. The crew were rescued. She was a total loss.

=== 3 September ===
List of shipwrecks: 3 September 1930
Ship	State	Description
Assimacos	Greece	The cargo ship ran aground at Cape Silleiro, Spain. She was declared a total loss on 16 September.
Liny	Germany	The schooner was in collision with the steamer Hero (United Kingdom) in the Weser in northwestern Germany and was beached.
Mimi	Germany	The schooner was in collision with the steamer Hero (United Kingdom) in the Weser in northwestern Germany and was beached.
USC&GS Oceanographer	United States Coast and Geodetic Survey	The ocean survey ship ran aground on the Lobster Rocks, Islesboro, Maine. She was refloated, repaired, and returned to service.

=== 7 September ===
List of shipwrecks: 7 September 1930
Ship	State	Description
Chase	United States	Carrying a cargo of three tons of canned clams and coal and a crew of one, the 11-gross register ton, 38.8-foot (11.8 m) motor vessel departed Kodiak on Kodiak Island bound for Seward, Territory of Alaska, and was never heard from again. She disappeared without trace.

=== 8 September ===
List of shipwrecks: 8 September 1930
Ship	State	Description
Bol	United States	The 25-gross register ton motor vessel was wrecked on Strawberry Bar (60°24′N 146°03′W) on the south-central coast of the Territory of Alaska. Her crew of two abandoned ship in a skiff and survived.
Innisinver	United Kingdom	The cargo ship struck submerged wreckage in the English Channel 5.5 nautical miles (10.2 km) south of Portland Bill, Dorset and sank. All crew survived.
Maria M.	Greece	The cargo ship was severely damaged by fire at Drapetsona when benzine leaked from the tanker Donax (United Kingdom) and caught fire. Seven other sailing vessels were destroyed by fire, and many others were damaged.
Mary Patricia	United Kingdom	The cargo ship was abandoned in the Atlantic Ocean off Cape Breton Island, Nova Scotia, Canada.

=== 9 September ===
List of shipwrecks: 9 September 1930
Ship	State	Description
Tupy	Brazil	The cargo ship was wrecked 30 nautical miles (56 km) south of Vitória.

=== 10 September ===
List of shipwrecks: 10 September 1930
Ship	State	Description
Malmesbury	United Kingdom	The cargo ship ran aground on the Jacob Reef, off the coast of South Africa and was abandoned. The crew were rescued. She broke in tow on 16 September and was a total loss.

=== 11 September ===
List of shipwrecks: 11 September 1930
Ship	State	Description
Edera	Italy	The cargo ship ran aground in the North Sea on Bollen Hinder Bank of the coast of the Netherlands. She was refloated on 16 October.

=== 13 September ===
List of shipwrecks: 13 September 1930
Ship	State	Description
Lorne, Pacific Gatherer	United Kingdom	Second Narrows Bridge The tug and barge collided with the Second Narrows Bridge, Vancouver, British Columbia, Canada and jammed under it. The rising tide eventually caused the collapse of the bridge, which took four years to repair.
Nine	United Kingdom	The cargo ship ran aground on the Sealark Reef, Guadalcanal, Solomon Islands and was a total loss. The crew were rescued.

=== 15 September ===
List of shipwrecks: 15 September 1930
Ship	State	Description
Owl	United States	The 14-gross register ton fishing vessel drifted onto a reef in Wide Bay (57°22′N 156°11′W) on the south-central coast of the Territory of Alaska and was wrecked after a malfunctioning clutch caused her gasoline engine to break down. Her crew of three survived.

=== 18 September ===
List of shipwrecks: 18 September 1930
Ship	State	Description
Alma	Germany	The schooner came ashore at Luleå, Sweden and was wrecked. Her crew were rescued.
Goteborg	Sweden	The coaster ran aground north of Lysekil, Västra Götaland County and sank. All passengers and crew were rescued.

=== 19 September ===
List of shipwrecks: 19 September 1930
Ship	State	Description
Kwalju Maru	Japan	The cargo ship ran aground in the Yangtze downstream of Antung, China. She broke in two and was a total loss.
Llandilo	United Kingdom	The cargo ship ran aground on the Rabbit Islands, Turkey. She was refloated on 29 September but again ran aground. She was refloated again on 1 October.
Tigris	Belgium	The cargo ship passed Dungeness, Kent, United Kingdom, bound for Alexandria, Egypt. No further trace, presumed foundered with the loss of all hands.
Tréport	United Kingdom	The cargo ship ran aground on the Girdler Sands, in the North Sea off the Essex coast. The crew were rescued by Queen of Thanet (United Kingdom) and the Margate Lifeboat. She was a total loss.

=== 20 September ===
List of shipwrecks: 20 September 1930
Ship	State	Description
Madeleine Tristan	France	The three-masted schooner was driven ashore at Chesil Beach, Dorset, United Kingdom and was wrecked. All seven crew were rescued.
Theodoros Bulgaris	Greece	The cargo ship lost her steering gear in a storm in the Atlantic Ocean (46°48′N 6°43′W). She was abandoned at 47°15′N 6°20′W, the crew were rescued by Advocate (United Kingdom). Theodoris Bulgaris was towed into Brest, Finistère, France on 23 September by Livadia (Germany).

=== 21 September ===
List of shipwrecks: 21 September 1930
Ship	State	Description
Foxhon	Netherlands	The coaster foundered in the Thames Estuary with the loss of three of the five people on board. Survivors were rescued by the trawler Notre Dame des Ardents (France).

=== 22 September ===
List of shipwrecks: 22 September 1930
Ship	State	Description
Ida	Belgium	The coaster ran aground at Prawle Point, Devon, United Kingdom in dense fog. All twelve crew were rescued. She broke in two on 9 October, and had broken up by November.

=== 23 September ===
List of shipwrecks: 23 September 1930
Ship	State	Description
City of Osaka	United Kingdom	The cargo ship ran aground 6 nautical miles (11 km) south of Buchanness, Aberdeenshire. The crew were rescued by HMS Walker (Royal Navy) or breeches buoy.
Deerhound	Belgium	The cargo ship ran aground in the River Humber, United Kingdom. She was refloated and was then hit by Lakewood (United Kingdom) and sank.
Eagle	United States	While laid up on the gridiron in Odiak Slough (60°32′30″N 145°46′00″W) – where she had lain since July 1930 – near Cordova, Territory of Alaska, with no one aboard, the single-masted motor vessel was destroyed by a storm.
Matsqui	United Kingdom	The cargo ship caught fire off Vancouver, British Columbia, Canada and was beached.

=== 24 September ===
List of shipwrecks: 24 September 1930
Ship	State	Description
Chance	United States	During a voyage in the Territory of Alaska from Juneau to Sitka, the 16-gross register ton motor vessel was destroyed by fire off Marmion Island (58.1986°N 134.2569°W) in Southeast Alaska. The only person aboard abandoned ship in a small boat and reported Chance′s burned-out hull aground above the high-water mark between Marmion Island and Douglas Island.
Kasugayama Maru	Japan	The cargo ship ran aground on Sakhalin in the Soviet Union and was wrecked.
Taniwha	United Kingdom	The cargo ship sank at Puriri, New Zealand.

=== 25 September ===
List of shipwrecks: 25 September 1930
Ship	State	Description
Katingo	Greece	The cargo ship ran aground at Nagara Point, Turkey. She was refloated on 28 September.

=== 26 September ===
List of shipwrecks: 26 September 1930
Ship	State	Description
Agnesina	Italy	The brigantine was abandoned in the Mediterranean Sea (36°22′N 19°56′E). All nine people on board were rescued by Lalandia (Denmark).
Doris	United Kingdom	The schooner came ashore at the mouth of the River Tees, County Durham. Her crew were rescued. She broke her back the next day and was a total loss.
Margarita	United Kingdom	The cargo ship collided with Nueva Señora del Carmen (Spain) in the Strait of Gibraltar and was beached in Gibraltar Bay. She was refloated the next day.
North Shore	United States	The gas steamer sank in Lake Michigan between Benton Harbor, Michigan and Milwaukee, Wisconsin, in a gale. Wreckage found floating 30 miles (48 km) north of Racine, Wisconsin. Lost with her captain, his wife and all five hands.

=== 28 September ===
List of shipwrecks: 28 September 1930
Ship	State	Description
Vibert T Shave	United Kingdom	The schooner collided with Haugarland (Norway) in the Atlantic Ocean 3 nautical miles (5.6 km) off Ferryland, Newfoundland with the loss of five of the six people on board.

=== 29 September ===
List of shipwrecks: 29 September 1930
Ship	State	Description
Princess Lena	United States	The 10-gross register ton, 29.8-foot (9.1 m) motor vessel broke loose from her mooring to a barge during a gale and was wrecked on Mansfield Peninsula (58.2461°N 134.8206°W) on the coast of Southeast Alaska 1 nautical mile (1.9 km; 1.2 mi) south of Horse Island (58.2517°N 134.7258°W) abreast of Douglas Island. The only person aboard survived.

=== Unknown date ===
List of shipwrecks: Unknown date 1930
Ship	State	Description
South Coast	United States	The steamer sank in the Pacific Ocean between Coos Bay, Oregon and Crescent City, California possibly between Brookings and Gold Beach after leaving port on 14 or 16 September. Wreckage found later indicated she broke up on rocks. Lost with all 19 hands.

== October ==
=== 2 October ===
List of shipwrecks: 2 October 1930
Ship	State	Description
Elmo II	United States	With her captain ashore and only one crewman aboard, the 8-gross register ton motor vessel drifted ashore and broke up at Comet, Territory of Alaska, after her anchor line broke during a gale. The crewman escaped unharmed.

=== 3 October ===
List of shipwrecks: 3 October 1930
Ship	State	Description
Fort McPherson	United Kingdom	The cargo ship came ashore in the Richardson Islands, Northwest Territories, Canada, and was wrecked.

=== 5 October ===
List of shipwrecks: 5 October 1930
Ship	State	Description
Lottie May	United Kingdom	The schooner was destroyed by fire in the Bay d'Espoir, Newfoundland. The crew survived.

=== 6 October ===
List of shipwrecks: 6 October 1930
Ship	State	Description
Bamfield	United Kingdom	The cargo ship collided with the steamer Princess Joan (United Kingdom) in the Pacific Ocean off Discovery Island, British Columbia, Canada, and sank.

=== 9 October ===
List of shipwrecks: 9 October 1930
Ship	State	Description
Agnes	Norway	The cargo ship broke free from her moorings in a storm at Haugesund, Norway, and sank.
Allende	United Kingdom	The cargo ship ran aground at Mokha, Aden Protectorate. She was refloated on 13 October.

=== 11 October ===
List of shipwrecks: 11 October 1930
Ship	State	Description
Lutetian	United Kingdom	The tanker ran aground on Margarita Island, Venezuela. She was refloated on 16 October.
Mersey Rose	United Kingdom	The cargo ship collided with the steamer Gleneden (United Kingdom) in the English Channel off St. Catherine's Point, Isle of Wight (50°01′N 2°04′W), England, and sank. Gleneden rescued her crew.

=== 13 October ===
List of shipwrecks: 13 October 1930
Ship	State	Description
Corapeake	United States	The schooner collided with a number of scows at Norfolk, Virginia, and sank.
Tiffon	Estonia	The schooner came ashore at Säkkijärvi, Finland, and was wrecked. Her crew were rescued.

=== 14 October ===
List of shipwrecks: 14 October 1930
Ship	State	Description
Faustina	United Kingdom	The schooner sprang a leak in the Atlantic Ocean and was abandoned at 41°42′N 24°51′W. The steamer Wearwood (United Kingdom) rescued her crew.

=== 15 October ===
List of shipwrecks: 15 October 1930
Ship	State	Description
Defiance	United States	During a voyage in the Territory of Alaska from Nome to Kotzebue, the 7-gross register ton, 37-foot (11.3 m) motor lighterage vessel sank in bad weather in Kotzebue Sound near Cape Blossom. The steamer Arthur J. Baldwin (United States) rescued her crew of four.
Demokratia	Greece	The cargo ship ran aground off the Leander's Tower, Istanbul, Turkey. She was refloated on 22 October.

=== 16 October ===
List of shipwrecks: 16 October 1930
Ship	State	Description
Antonin del Collado	Italy	The passenger ship collided with the steamer Hallmoor (United Kingdom) in the Atlantic Ocean 10 nautical miles (19 km) off Mariel, Cuba, and sank. Hallmoor rescued all on board.

=== 17 October ===
List of shipwrecks: 17 October 1930
Ship	State	Description
Elkhound	United Kingdom	The tanker was destroyed by fire at Thameshaven, Essex, England.

=== 19 October ===
List of shipwrecks: 19 October 1930
Ship	State	Description
Millie	United Kingdom	The Thames barge foundered in the Thames Estuary in England. The steamer Baltrader (United Kingdom) rescued her crew of two.

=== 21 October ===
List of shipwrecks: 21 October 1930
Ship	State	Description
Fito	Spain	The cargo ship collided with another vessel 12 nautical miles (22 km) east of Sálvora, Galicia, Spain, and sank.

=== 22 October ===
List of shipwrecks: 22 October 1930
Ship	State	Description
Zannis Xenios	Greece	The cargo ship ran aground on Seskli island in the Aegean Sea and sank. Her crew survived.

=== 24 October ===
List of shipwrecks: 24 October 1930
Ship	State	Description
Kong Ragnar	Norway	The cargo ship came ashore at Randøy, Norway, and sank with the loss of six crew.
Ortona	United Kingdom	The cargo ship ran aground in the River Tees at Middlesbrough, Yorkshire, England. She was refloated on 8 November.

=== 25 October ===
List of shipwrecks: 25 October 1930
Ship	State	Description
Sonnia	United Kingdom	The cargo ship foundered 7 nautical miles (13 km) northeast of The Skerries, Isle of Anglesey. The crew took to the lifeboats and landed at Moelfre, Anglesey, England. Her captain was rescued by the fishing trawler Jeanne (Belgium).
HDMS Triton	Royal Danish Navy	The Æger-class submarine was severely damaged by an onboard explosion. Subsequently repaired and returned to service.

=== 28 October ===
List of shipwrecks: 28 October 1930
Ship	State	Description
Andalusia	Italy	The cargo ship ran aground at Tønsnesskjæret, Troms, Norway. She was refloated on 2 November.

=== 31 October ===
List of shipwrecks: 31 October 1930
Ship	State	Description
Rahra	United Kingdom	The three-masted auxiliary schooner ran aground on Danger Island in the Cook Islands and was wrecked.

== November ==
=== 1 November ===
List of shipwrecks: 1 November 1930
Ship	State	Description
Ascot	United Kingdom	The cargo ship ran aground at Quequon, Argentina. She was refloated on 9 November.
Choshun Maru	Japan	The passenger ship ran aground on Green Island, Hong Kong. The passengers and crew were taken off.

=== 2 November ===
List of shipwrecks: 2 November 1930
Ship	State	Description
Commandant Marchand	France	The schooner capsized in the Bristol Channel off Cardiff, Glamorgan, United Kingdom.
Ethel	United Kingdom	The cargo ship ran aground at Bideford, Devon. She was refloated on 5 November.
Helmsdale	United Kingdom	The cargo ship ran aground on Als, Denmark. She was refloated on 6 November.
Julia	United Kingdom	The schooner ran aground at The Needles, Isle of Wight. She was refloated on 10 November.
Ma Gondole	France	The cargo ship foundered in the English Channel off Portland Bill, Dorset, United Kingdom. Three crew were rescued by Josephine Charlotte (Belgium).
Menelaos	Greece	The cargo ship (1,588 GRT, 1898) was abandoned in the English Channel about 6 nautical miles (11 km) south south west of Selsey Bill, Sussex, United Kingdom. Her crew were rescued by Canute and Naperian (both United Kingdom).

=== 5 November ===
List of shipwrecks: 5 November 1930
Ship	State	Description
Seven Seas Trader	United Kingdom	The cargo ship was driven ashore at Trapani, Sicily, Italy. She was refloated on 11 November.

=== 6 November ===
List of shipwrecks: 6 November 1930
Ship	State	Description
Hakusan Maru	Japan	The cargo ship collided with Benmacdhui (United Kingdom) at Kobe and was beached. She was refloated on 8 November.
Hermione	United Kingdom	The tanker ran aground at Kara Point, Greece. She was refloated on 10 November.
Seiyo Maru	Japan	The cargo ship lost her rudder in the Pacific Ocean (50°30′N 176°48′E) and was abandoned in a sinking condition. Her crew were rescued by Shiraha Maru (Japan).

=== 7 November ===
List of shipwrecks: 7 November 1930
Ship	State	Description
Santa Rita	Italy	The cargo ship ran aground at the mouth of the Adour river, Bayonne, Basses-Pyrénées, France and broke her back. She was a total loss.
Tamiahua	United States	The tanker ran aground off the Pigeon Point Lighthouse, California. She was refloated on 26 November.

=== 8 November ===
List of shipwrecks: 8 November 1930
Ship	State	Description
Brooklyn	United States	The coaster was disabled when her engine room filled with water crossing the bar at Eureka, California. She drifted ashore three miles (4.8 km) up the coast and broke up in heavy surf. 17 crewmen and 1 stowaway were killed, there was 1 survivor.
Dunham Wheeler	United States	The schooner foundered in the Atlantic Ocean off Cape Canaveral, Florida. Ten crew were rescued by Aztec (Honduras).
Kenton	United Kingdom	The cargo ship ran aground at Akban Liman, Turkey. She was refloated on 16 November.
Northern Light	United States	The barge, a former freighter, foundered in a storm off Key Largo in the Florida Keys after losing her tow. Five crew were killed and one was rescued by the tugboat Ontario.
Olive Moore	United Kingdom	The schooner foundered in the Atlantic Ocean (35°35′N 15°50′W). Six crew were rescued by Montello (Italy).

=== 9 November ===
List of shipwrecks: 9 November 1930
Ship	State	Description
Laura	United States	The 8-gross register ton fishing vessel drifted ashore and broke up near Grindall Point (55°27′10″N 132°09′15″W) outside of Kasaan Bay (55.4972222°N 132.3194444°W) in Southeast Alaska after her anchor chain broke in a gale. The only person aboard survived.
Stralsund	Germany	The coaster passed Dover, Kent, United Kingdom bound for Gothenburg, Sweden. No further trace. Presumed foundered in the North Sea off Sylt, Schleswig-Holstein, where a lifeboat washed up on 15 November.
Tanja	Sweden	The coaster departed the Free City of Danzig for Trollhättan. No further trace, presumed foundered with the loss of all hands.

=== 10 November ===
List of shipwrecks: 10 November 1930
Ship	State	Description
Ilford	United Kingdom	The cargo ship ran aground at São Vicente, Cape Verde Islands, Portugal. She was refloated on 14 November.
Linkmoor	United Kingdom	The cargo ship ran aground at Skarfskerry Head, Caithness. All crew were rescued. She was declared a total loss on 19 November.
Teifi	United Kingdom	The cargo ship struck a submerged object in the Bristol Channel off Cardiff, Glamorgan and sank. Her crew survived. She may have struck the wreck of the French schooner Commandant Marchand.

=== 11 November ===
List of shipwrecks: 11 November 1930
Ship	State	Description
Moyalla	United Kingdom	The coaster ran aground at Ballina, County Mayo, Ireland. She was refloated on 10 December.

=== 12 November ===
List of shipwrecks: 12 November 1930
Ship	State	Description
Else	Denmark	The coaster ran aground in the Kattegat off Hjelm and sank.
Glenarch	United Kingdom	The cargo ship ran aground in the Penfeld at Brest, Finistère, France. She was refloated on 16 November.
Joyce Llewellyn	United Kingdom	The cargo ship came ashore on the west coast of Ven, Sweden. She was refloated on 16 November.
Sahara	Spain	The schooner collided with the trawler Santa Eulala (Spain) in the Atlantic Ocean off Las Palmas, Canary Islands and sank. Her crew were rescued by Santa Eulala.

=== 13 November ===
List of shipwrecks: 13 November 1930
Ship	State	Description
Yero Callas	Greece	The ship was driven ashore at Cape Upright, Chile. She was on a voyage from Montevideo, Uruguay to Valparaíso, Chile. Yero Callas was refloated on 6 December.

=== 14 November ===
List of shipwrecks: 14 November 1930
Ship	State	Description
Doreena	United Kingdom	The Thames barge collided with Camberwell (United Kingdom) in the River Thames and sank with the loss of a crew member.
Laimons	Latvia	The cargo ship ran aground on the Curonian Spit. Her crew were rescued.
Margherita Madre	Italy	The schooner was abandoned in the Tyrrhenian Sea 2 nautical miles (3.7 km) off Punta Imperatore, Ischia.
Yero Carras	Greece	The cargo ship came ashore at Cape Upright, Chile. She was declared a total loss on 18 November, but was refloated on 6 December and beached at Baker Cove.

=== 15 November ===
List of shipwrecks: 15 November 1930
Ship	State	Description
Anglesea Rose	United Kingdom	The cargo ship ran aground at Yarmouth, Isle of Wight. She was refloated on 18 November.
Laura	Chile	The full-rigged ship was wrecked in Cucao Lake, Chiloé Island with the loss of all but eight crew.

=== 16 November ===
List of shipwrecks: 16 November 1930
Ship	State	Description
Brière	France	The cargo ship ran aground north east of Brest, Finistère. She broke in two on 20 November and was a total loss.
Hursley	United Kingdom	The coaster ran aground on the Goodwin Sands, Kent and sank. Six crew were rescued by the Ramsgate Lifeboat.
Ronald M. Douglas	United Kingdom	The schooner was abandoned in the Atlantic Ocean (33°22′N 49°12′W). She was set on fire by her crew, who were rescued by Murex (United Kingdom).

=== 17 November ===
List of shipwrecks: 17 November 1930
Ship	State	Description
Trevellas	United Kingdom	The auxiliary three masted schooner departed Port Talbot, Glamorgan for New Ross, County Wexford, Ireland. No further trace, presumed foundered with the loss of all hands.

=== 18 November ===
List of shipwrecks: 18 November 1930
Ship	State	Description
Rosie	United States	While beached for repairs on Goose Island (60°43′N 146°43′W) in Prince William Sound on the south-central coast of the Territory of Alaska, the 9-gross register ton, 33.4-foot (10.2 m) fishing vessel went adrift during a gale and broke up on the shore of the island. The only person aboard survived.

=== 19 November ===
List of shipwrecks: 19 November 1930
Ship	State	Description
Continental Freighter	United Kingdom	The cargo ship collided with Hebble (United Kingdom) in the Scheldt at Antwerp, Belgium and sank. She was refloated on 4 December.
Highland Hope	United Kingdom	The ocean liner ran aground on Farilhões Island, Berlengas, Portugal and was a total loss. All on board were rescued by a Portuguese Navy vessel and Portuguese fishing boats.
J. H. Barrow	United Kingdom	The schooner was driven ashore in the River Severn at Oldbury-on-Severn, Gloucestershire. She was refloated on 22 November.
Ovidia	Sweden	The cargo ship sprang a leak in the Atlantic Ocean 400 nautical miles (740 km) south east of Cape Race, Newfoundland (42°00′N 50°55′W) and was abandoned. Twenty-eight people and the ship's cat were rescued by Mauretania (United Kingdom).

=== 20 November ===
List of shipwrecks: 20 November 1930
Ship	State	Description
Dronning Sophie	Ireland	The coal hulk sank at Queenstown, County Cork.
Ida Adams	United Kingdom	The 125-foot (38 m), 275-ton steam trawler was wrecked in fog on Frenchman's Rocks, or Fisherman's Rocks, northwest of Portnahaven, Rinns of Islay and then slipped off into deeper water. The crew rowed 4 miles (6.4 km) to shore in her boat.
Kenkon Maru No.8	Japan	The cargo ship ran aground off Dalozaki and broke in two. She was a total loss.
Verena	Netherlands	The auxiliary schooner came ashore at Cape Arkona, Mecklenburg-Vorpommern, Germany and was wrecked. Her crew were rescued.

=== 21 November ===
List of shipwrecks: 21 November 1930
Ship	State	Description
Ruperra	United Kingdom	The cargo ship ran aground in Angle Bay, Pembrokeshire. She was refloated on 5 December.
Sunko Maru	Japan	The coaster caught fire and sank off in the Pacific Ocean off Tosa Province.
Teresa	United States	The 8-gross register ton, 30-foot (9.1 m) fishing vessel sank near Khaz Head (57°31′45″N 136°01′00″W) in Southeast Alaska during a storm. The vessel Estebeth (United States) rescued all four people who had been aboard Teresa.

=== 23 November ===
List of shipwrecks: 23 November 1930
Ship	State	Description
Luise Leonhardt	Germany	The cargo ship was driven on the Grosser Vogel sandbank, in the North Sea off the mouth of the Elbe and sank with the loss of all 31 crew.

=== 24 November ===
List of shipwrecks: 24 November 1930
Ship	State	Description
Krysanthi Patera	Greece	The cargo ship caught fire in the Atlantic Ocean 75 nautical miles (139 km) off Cristóbal, Colón, Panama and was abandoned. All crew were rescued by Trevean (United Kingdom) before she sank.
HMAS Torrens	Royal Australian Navy	The River-class torpedo-boat destroyer was sunk in the Tasman Sea off Australia's Sydney Heads by a gelignite charge after use as a gunnery target during the day.

=== 25 November ===
List of shipwrecks: 25 November 1930
Ship	State	Description
Anna Helen	United States	During a voyage via the Inland Passage from Seattle, Washington, to the Territory of Alaska, the 80-gross register ton motor yacht was destroyed by fire in Discovery Passage 8 nautical miles (15 km; 9.2 mi) west of Seymour Narrows on the coast of British Columbia in Canada. He crew of four survived, but she was deemed a total loss.
Citta di Trani	United Kingdom	The auxiliary schooner was wrecked in the Abaco Islands.

=== 29 November ===
List of shipwrecks: 29 November 1930
Ship	State	Description
Lütt	Germany	The auxiliary three-masted schooner capsized in the Baltic Sea off Rugenwalde, Western Pomerania. She was towed into Swinemüne on 9 December.

=== 30 November ===
List of shipwrecks: 30 November 1930
Ship	State	Description
Perez	Spain	The schooner was driven ashore at Valencia and was wrecked. Her crew were rescued.

=== Unknown date ===
List of shipwrecks: Unknown November 1930
Ship	State	Description
Seiyo Maru	Japan	The 405-foot (123 m) 6,550-ton cargo ship was abandoned on 4 November after losing her rudder and listing in a typhoon south of the Aleutian Islands in the Pacific Ocean on 2 November. Her crew were rescued by Shiraha Maru (Japan).

== December ==
=== 1 December ===
List of shipwrecks: 1 December 1930
Ship	State	Description
Georges Philippar	France	The ocean liner caught fire at Saint-Nazaire, Loire-Inférieure whilst being fitted out. She was completed in January 1932 and was lost on her maiden voyage.

=== 2 December ===
List of shipwrecks: 2 December 1930
Ship	State	Description
Asmund	Norway	The cargo ship ran aground at Holyhead, Anglesey, United Kingdom. She sank on 7 December.
Southland	United States	The retired 1,521-gross register ton cargo liner was burned and scuttled as a means of disposal in 160 feet (49 m) of water off Scituate, Massachusetts.

=== 3 December ===
List of shipwrecks: 3 December 1930
Ship	State	Description
Hedwig	Netherlands	The cargo ship ran aground on a coral reef off Pratas Island (approximately 20°N 116°E) and was wrecked.
Linton	United Kingdom	The coaster was wrecked at Cape Forchu, Yarmouth, Nova Scotia, Canada with the loss of all eight crew.

=== 4 December ===
List of shipwrecks: 4 December 1930
Ship	State	Description
Alda	Spain	The cargo ship ran aground at Navia, Asturias. She was refloated on 9 December.

=== 5 December ===
List of shipwrecks: 5 December 1930
Ship	State	Description
Dazzle	United Kingdom	The auxiliary schooner was abandoned 8 nautical miles (15 km) off Ramea, Newfoundland. Her crew were rescued.
Yselhaven	Netherlands	The cargo ship collided with Oakland (United Kingdom) in the Weser at Nordenham, Germany and was beached. She was refloated on 9 December.

=== 7 December ===
List of shipwrecks: 7 December 1930
Ship	State	Description
Irene B	United States	During a gale, large waves struck the 7-gross register ton motor vessel while she was hauled out on the beach 0.5 miles (0.8 km) south of Wrangell, Territory of Alaska, and broke her up.

=== 8 December ===
List of shipwrecks: 8 December 1930
Ship	State	Description
Artiglio	Italy	The salvage vessel was sunk in the Bay of Biscay between Belle Île and Houat, Morbihan, France by the explosion of munitions on board Florence H (United States), which she was salvaging, with the loss of fourteen of her nineteen crew. Survivors were rescued by Rostro (Italy).
Belle (or Bell E)	United States	The 8-gross register ton motor vessel sank abreast of Spire Island (55°16′10″N 131°30′00″W) in Southeast Alaska after the flywheel flew off her gasoline engine and punched a hole in her hull below the waterline. The only person aboard abandoned ship in a skiff and survived.

=== 10 December ===
List of shipwrecks: 10 December 1930
Ship	State	Description
Don Carlos	Argentina	The coaster sank in the Uruguay River, Buenos Aires with the loss of one of her eleven crew.
Empress of Scotland	United Kingdom	The ocean liner was gutted by fire at a shipbreakers' yard in Blyth, Northumberland. She broke in two and sank. Scrapping was completed in 1933.
Hilda	United Kingdom	The barquentine collided with the trawler Kudos (United Kingdom) in the North Sea 15 nautical miles (28 km) off Hartlepool, County Durham and sank. All six crew were rescued by Kudos.
Vialle Montagne III	Sweden	The cargo ship collided with Kresnamn (Germany) at Gothenburg and sank.

=== 11 December ===
List of shipwrecks: 11 December 1930
Ship	State	Description
Amy G. McKean	United Kingdom	The schooner sprang a leak in the Atlantic Ocean (50°25′N 20°08′W). She was set on fire and abandoned by her crew, who were rescued by Strasan (Sweden).
Saltwick	United Kingdom	The cargo ship ran aground in the Paraná River, Argentina. She was refloated on 14 December.
Schlesien	Germany	The ocean liner ran aground in the Kii Channel. She was refloated on 15 December.

=== 12 December ===
List of shipwrecks: 12 December 1930
Ship	State	Description
Oberon	Finland	The passenger steamer collided with the passenger steamer Arcturus (Finland) in fog in the Kattegat and sank in three minutes with the loss of 41 passengers and crew.

=== 13 December ===
List of shipwrecks: 13 December 1930
Ship	State	Description
Nordo	Finland	The auxiliary sailing ship ran aground on Svanegrunden, Kattegat. Her crew were rescued.

=== 15 December ===
List of shipwrecks: 15 December 1930
Ship	State	Description
Chapel Point	United Kingdom	The auxiliary schooner was abandoned in the Pacific Ocean off Punta Colonet, Baja California Mexico, and was a total loss.
Chester L	United States	The 11-gross register ton motor vessel caught fire and, after a hole was cut in her bow to douse the flames, was towed to the beach 6 nautical miles (11 km; 6.9 mi) southeast of Boss Island (56°30′N 134°12′W) in Southeast Alaska, where she sank. The only person aboard survived.
Warren M. Colp	United Kingdom	The schooner came ashore at Burnt Point, Newfoundland and was wrecked with the loss of four of her six crew.

=== 16 December ===
List of shipwrecks: 16 December 1930
Ship	State	Description
Gipsy Queen	United Kingdom	The schooner was abandoned in the Atlantic Ocean off the coast of Newfoundland. Her crew survived.
Thraki	Greece	The cargo ship ran aground at Kavala, Greece. She was refloated on 21 December.

=== 17 December ===
List of shipwrecks: 17 December 1930
Ship	State	Description
Alice	United States	While the 11-gross register ton motor vessel was anchored in the Karta River (55°34′N 132°34′W) in Southeast Alaska, she caught fire when her gasoline engine backfired. The fire went out of control, and she burned to the waterline and sank in 48 to 54 feet (14.6 to 16.5 m) of water. There was no loss of life.

=== 18 December ===
List of shipwrecks: 18 December 1930
Ship	State	Description
Ceramic	United Kingdom	The ocean liner collided with the cargo ship Laguna (United Kingdom) in the River Thames near Gravesend, England. Both ships suffered sight damage.
Christos Sigalas	Greece	The cargo ship sprang a leak in the Atlantic Ocean (approximately 33°N 69°W) and was abandoned in a sinking condition. Her crew were rescued by Monfiore (Italy).
Cremon	Germany	The cargo ship was beached at Üto.

=== 19 December ===
List of shipwrecks: 19 December 1930
Ship	State	Description
Oberon	Finland	The ferry collided with Arcturus (Finland) in the Kattegat off Læsø, Denmark and sank with the loss of 42 of the 82 people on board. Survivors were rescued by Arcturus.

=== 20 December ===
List of shipwrecks: 20 December 1930
Ship	State	Description
Glen Derry	United Kingdom	The cargo ship caught fire in the North Sea off Happisburgh, Norfolk and was abandoned. Her crew were rescued by Heworth (United Kingdom). Glen Derry later sank.

=== 21 December ===
List of shipwrecks: 21 December 1930
Ship	State	Description
Oinoussios	Greece	The cargo ship ran aground at Nicolaeff, Ukraine. She was refloated on 29 December.
Rio Azul	United Kingdom	The cargo ship collided with Hopatcong (United States) at Istanbul, Turkey and was beached.

=== 22 December ===
List of shipwrecks: 22 December 1930
Ship	State	Description
Lucy	United Kingdom	The cargo ship ran aground at Kettleness, Yorkshire and was abandoned. The crew were rescued by the Whitby Lifeboat.
Malve	Finland	The cargo ship ran aground at Knollen Drogden.
Sonja	Norway	The cargo ship ran aground at Ronglevær, Norway. She was refloated on 29 December.
Suffolk Coast	United Kingdom	The coaster ran aground at King's Lynn, Norfolk. She was refloated on 5 January 1931.

=== 24 December ===
List of shipwrecks: 24 December 1930
Ship	State	Description
Uad Ras	Spanish Navy	The Uad Ras-class naval trawler was wrecked on this date.

=== 27 December ===
List of shipwrecks: 27 December 1930
Ship	State	Description
Queenmoor	United Kingdom	The cargo ship caught fire in the Indian Ocean and was abandoned by her crew. She was towed into Aden by Preserver (United Kingdom).

=== 29 December ===
List of shipwrecks: 29 December 1930
Ship	State	Description
Branch Railway	United Kingdom	The schooner was driven ashore at Cock's Cove, St. Mary's Bay, Newfoundland and was wrecked.

=== 31 December ===
List of shipwrecks: 31 December 1930
Ship	State	Description
Stela	Egypt	The cargo ship sprang a leak in the Aegean Sea off Levitha, Greece (36°46′N 28°46′E) and was abandoned. She sank 8 nautical miles (15 km) east of Astypalaia.
Theodoris Bulgaris	Greece	The cargo ship sprang a leak in the Atlantic Ocean and was abandoned (45°31′N 6°00′W). Her crew survived.

== Unknown date ==
List of shipwrecks: Unknown date 1930
Ship	State	Description
Aklavik	Canada	The 60-foot (18.3 m) sailing vessel sank in Bernard Harbour on the coast of the Northwest Territories in Canada due to damage she suffered while in winter lay-up there. She was refloated, repaired, and returned to service.
Baymaud	United Kingdom	The wreck of Baymaud, June 1998 The auxiliary three-masted schooner sank in Cambridge Bay, Northwest Territories, Canada.
City of Taunton	United States	The 292-foot (89 m) cargo ship, a sidewheel paddle steamer, was beached and abandoned at Somerset, Massachusetts, on the west bank of the Taunton River at 41°42′39″N 071°10′33″W, just south of the future site of the Charles M. Braga Jr. Memorial Bridge, sometime during the 1930s. The wreck settled on the river bottom in very shallow water.
F. C. Pendleton	United States	The 145-foot (44 m), 408-gross register ton three-masted schooner burned and sank without loss of life in up to 45 feet (14 m) of water at 44°19′38″N 068°54′27″W while at anchor in Seal Harbor at Islesboro, Maine, sometime during the 1930s.
Gardner G. Deering	United States	The 251-foot (77 m), 1,982-gross register ton five-masted schooner was abandoned and later burned in Smith Cove off West Brooksville, Maine, sometime during the 1930s. Her wreck settled in 10 to 30 feet (3.0 to 9.1 m) of water approximately 500 feet (150 m) off the north shore of the cove at 44°22′55″N 068°46′30″W.
Half Moon	United States	The yacht sank in the Atlantic Ocean off Key Biscayne, Florida.
HMS Peterel	Royal Navy	The river gunboat ran aground in the Yangtze. She was refloated and returned to service.
Unknown	United States	Unidentified dump scow in 2019. A wooden dump scow was abandoned and scuttled in 130 feet (40 m) of water in Lake Huron off the coast of Michigan at 45.212667°N 83.299567°W, probably circa 1930.
