= SS Iron Monarch =

Two steamships have been named SS Iron Monarch:

- SS Iron Monarch (1914), renamed Hatsu Maru and while at anchor in Manila Bay, Philippines on 13 November 1944, she was attacked by United States Navy carrier aircraft and sunk.
- SS Iron Monarch (1943), broken up October 1972.

== See also ==
- MV Iron Monarch (1973)
