= Grantham Island =

Island in South Australia

Coordinates: 34°46′S 135°52′E

Geography
- Location: Spencer Gulf

Administration
- Australia

Grantham Island is an uninhabited island occupying 51 hectares of Proper Bay, Spencer Gulf, South Australia. The nearest geographical feature on the mainland is Murray Point, which is also undeveloped. The island was named by explorer Matthew Flinders on 25 February 1802, after the municipal and parliamentary borough of Grantham, Lincolnshire, England. It lies 3 kilometres south of the Port Lincoln marina and is well vegetated.

== History ==
In 1874, yachtsmen described Grantham Island as hosting "an abundance of rabbits... of all shades of colour." At the time, the island was covered with mallee and other scrub. The yachtsmen had gone ashore to shoot rabbits and "other sport". One man came across a "native pheasant" which "soared majestically away" after being shot at. The party also amused themselves by lassoing penguins and setting them in the water racing.

In the 1880s, Arthur Searcy had an encounter with a wallaby on the island, which he speculated had swum over from the mainland.

In 1885, the South Australian Yacht Club stopped there to collect firewood.

In December 1909, the Flinders Brass Band arranged a picnic to Grantham Island. About 100 people attended and arrived by motor and sailing boats.

In February 1910, a fire was started on Grantham Island and became unmanageable. It spread over the whole island and after the fire, 'not a bush' remained. No stock were on the island at the time.

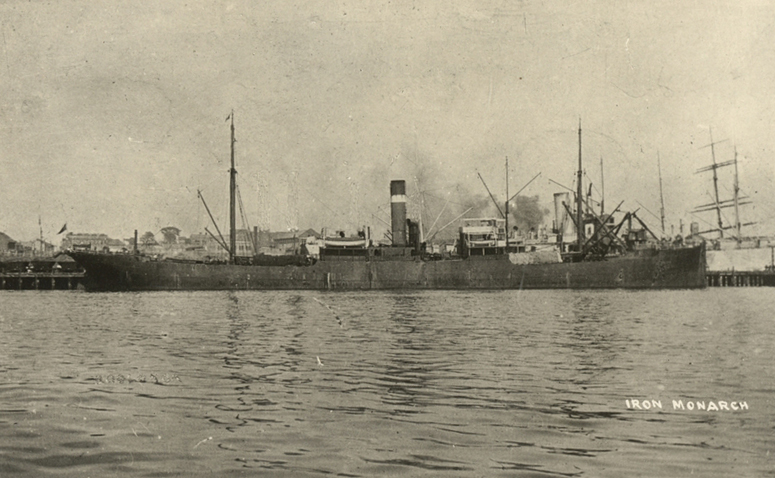
Postcard of the merchant vessel Iron Monarch (formerly SS Koolonga) pre-1937.

In 1937, the 28 ft cutter Sylvia was wrecked in Port Lincoln harbour on returning from a picnic on Grantham Island. The steamer Iron Monarch was going astern from the jetty when the cutter passed behind it to inspect the vessel. Sylvia was sucked into Iron Monarch's propeller and sank immediately. Two men clung to the rudder of Iron Monarch's propeller while is turned, while the other four aboard climbed into a dinghy which had been towed behind the cutter. The six occupants of the cutter all survived.

In 1939 The Lands Department advised that Grantham Island would shortly be gazetted for lease. In the meantime, monthly occupation was granted to A. S. Crawford.
