= Seskli =

Greek island in the Aegean Sea

Seskli (Greek: Σεσκλί) also known as Sesklio (Σέσκλιο), Sesklo (Σέσκλο) and Sesklia (Σεσκλιά) is a small Greek uninhabited island close to the island of Symi. Its ancient name was Teutloussa (Ancient Greek: Τεύτλουσα). There can be no doubt that is the same island that Pliny the Elder called Scutlusa.

On the island, there are archaeological findings from many different periods in history, including findings dating back to the late Neolithic period.

During the Peloponnesian War, the Athenian fleet under the general Charminus retreated to the island after its defeat from the Spartan fleet under Astyochus, and then fled to Halicarnassus.

The island is also mentioned by Pliny the Elder.
