= Samanco =

South Korean dessert brand

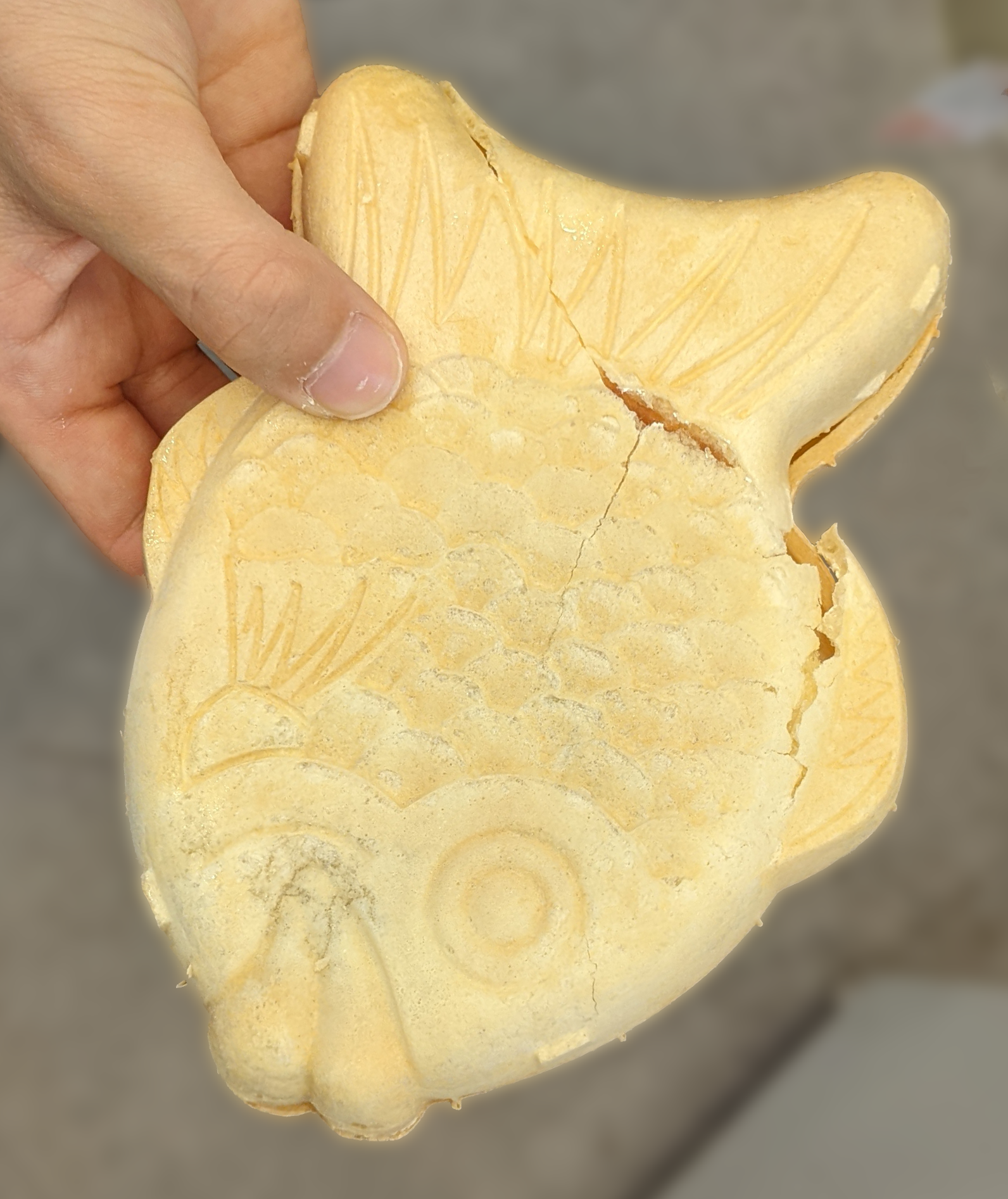
A typical ice cream carp waffle

Samanco (Korean: 참붕어싸만코) is a South Korean brand of waffle-encased ice cream in the shape of a carp. It typically has an ice cream filling flavored with red bean paste, although other flavors such as chocolate and green tea also exist.

The concept of the food is based on bungeo-ppang (carp bread, that fish being an auspicious symbol). Bungeo-ppang itself is possibly descended from the dish taiyaki from Japan.

Samanco is an emblematic summer fast food, and as of 2023 has achieved popularity in the West, where it is colloquially known as "ice cream fish".
