= Lopatka =

Lopatka or Łopatka (Czech/Slovak feminine: Lopatková) is a surname. Notable people with the surname include:

- Art Lopatka (1919–2007), American baseball player
- Mieczysław Łopatka (born 1939), Polish basketball player and coach
- Sharon Lopatka (1961–1996), American murder victim

== See also ==
- Cape Lopatka
