= Curlew Island (South Australia) =

Island in South Australia

- Location within South Australia

Geography
- Location: Spencer Gulf
- Coordinates: 32°32′25″S 137°46′18″E

Administration
- Australia

Curlew Island is a low mangrove-dominated island located near the head of Spencer Gulf, South Australia. It lies between Port Augusta and Point Lowly and is adjacent to the Playford B Power Station. Several ships ran aground in the shallow waters surrounding the island during the late 1800s and early 1900s. Several recreational boating accidents have also occurred in the vicinity (some involving fatalities). The locality is known for its fishing and for occasional whale sightings in the winter.

== History ==
In 1863, the island was described to mariners as "merely a large, thick patch of mangroves, separated from the point by a narrow channel, dry at low water... has a small sandy knoll at its north end, which only covers at high water springs."

On 29 June 1882, the Government approved of a recommendation to construct a magazine for powder and a smaller one for dynamite at Port Augusta to be placed on Curlew Island.

In July 1889, the first load of sea shells removed from Curlew Island was shipped to Port Pirie for use at the smelters.

In 1932, the Port Augusta Yacht Club sailed to Curlew Island and held a picnic ashore there. Picnics have been enjoyed there by many social groups, businesses and residents of nearby towns including Wilmington and Quorn. Picnics were sometimes held to farewell a community member who was leaving the region.

In June 1950, the possibility of 'dredging away' Curlew Island was announced. A swinging basin was determined to provide deep-water access to the newly proposed northern power station. Such a basin would allow ships to turn easily and unload equipment imported from England.

== Maritime incidents ==
=== Ship groundings ===
On 28 March 1878 the steamer Governor Musgrave en route to Port Augusta ran aground opposite Curlew Island. This prompted a request for a dredge to work in the channel.

On 2 December 1885, the barque Sedwell Jane was aground at Curlew Island.

On 14 March 1894, the steamer Melbourne, loaded with coal, ran aground at the Double Beacon near Curlew Island.

==== Iron Monarch ====
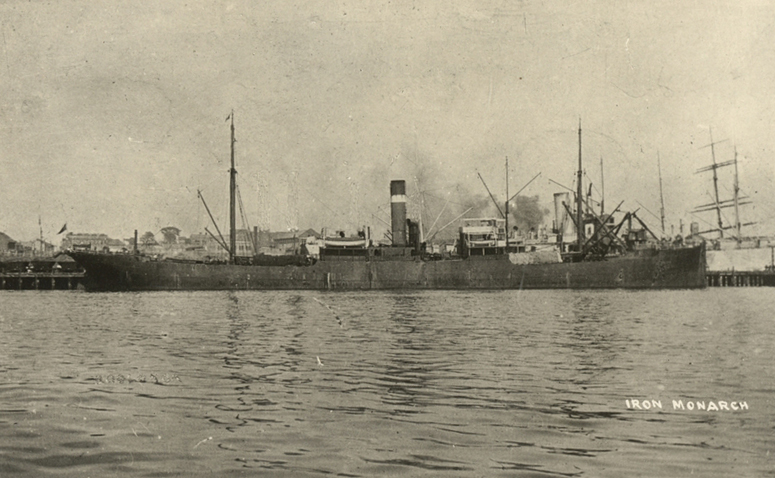
Postcard of the merchant vessel Iron Monarch (formerly SS Koolonga) pre-1937.

On 18 February 1930 BHP's steamer Iron Monarch ran aground on a sandbank inside No.6 Beacon near Curlew Island while en route to Port Augusta. She had aboard 6,500 tonnes of coal to deliver for the use of Commonwealth Railways. After it was realized that the vessel would not float on the rising tide, tugs and barges were sent from Port Pirie to unload the cargo and transship it to its destination. After unloading 1,600 tonnes of cargo, the vessel was freed on 27 February, only to demolish a beacon and strand again on another sand bank 18 kilometres (11 miles) out from Port Augusta (Commissariat Point). Once freed again with assistance from the tug Yacka, the vessel proceeded to Port Augusta to finish unloading its cargo. Its next consignment was to transport iron ore from Whyalla to Newcastle for steel-making.

=== Boating accidents ===
- On 9 January 1881, Percy Horn's yacht was caught in a gale near Curlew Island and sank in 23 ft of water. All aboard managed to swim ashore to safety.
- On 18 February 1883, six men were nearly drowned when a boat capsized and sank near Curlew Island. They were rescued by the crew of the yacht Henrietta.
- On 13 March 1886 a recreational fishing trip ended in tragedy near Curlew Island after the boat was filled with water and sank. The coroner determined that George William Dodson came to his death by exhaustion and Arrant Tobias Knutson was 'accidentally drowned by the upsetting of a boat.' Railway station master, John Frank Beesley of Port Augusta was the trip's sole survivor.
- On 6 June 1887, the open boat Australia capsized with fishermen aboard near Curlew Island. Mr J. Campbell survived, but Mark Last, who had caused the boat to capsize by climbing its mast (and could not swim) did not. Mr Last was the owner of the boat which was lost in the same vicinity the previous year, costing the lives of Knutson and Dodson.
- On 1 April 1896, three people died after a fishing party of seven departed Port Augusta for Curlew Island. The boat capsized in rough weather. Brothers Charles and Edward Addison (aged 12 and 10 years respectively) and Walter Evans were drowned.
- On 2 April 1946, the dead body of Patrick Joseph Cowley (approximately 70 years of age) was found floating off Curlew Island. His bicycle was later recovered when dragging the Port Augusta harbour. The bicycle was found 12 ft from the wharf's edge, so it was assumed that he had fallen off the wharf whilst riding at night.

== Wildlife ==
The mangroves of Curlew Island provide habitat for cormorants. Cormorants were considered competition by fishermen in the early 1900s. They were deliberately culled in efforts to improve the abundance of fish in South Australian waters. Humpback whales have been sighted by fishermen and coastal residents in the winter near Curlew Island. Southern right whales are also sighted, though less frequently. Whale sightings in the vicinity date back to 1894 with the first humpback whale sighting reported in 1913. A Bryde's whale was collected south of Curlew Island by a team from the South Australian Museum in April 1989. A baleen plate from the whale went on display at the museum in Adelaide in 2000.

=== Fishing ===
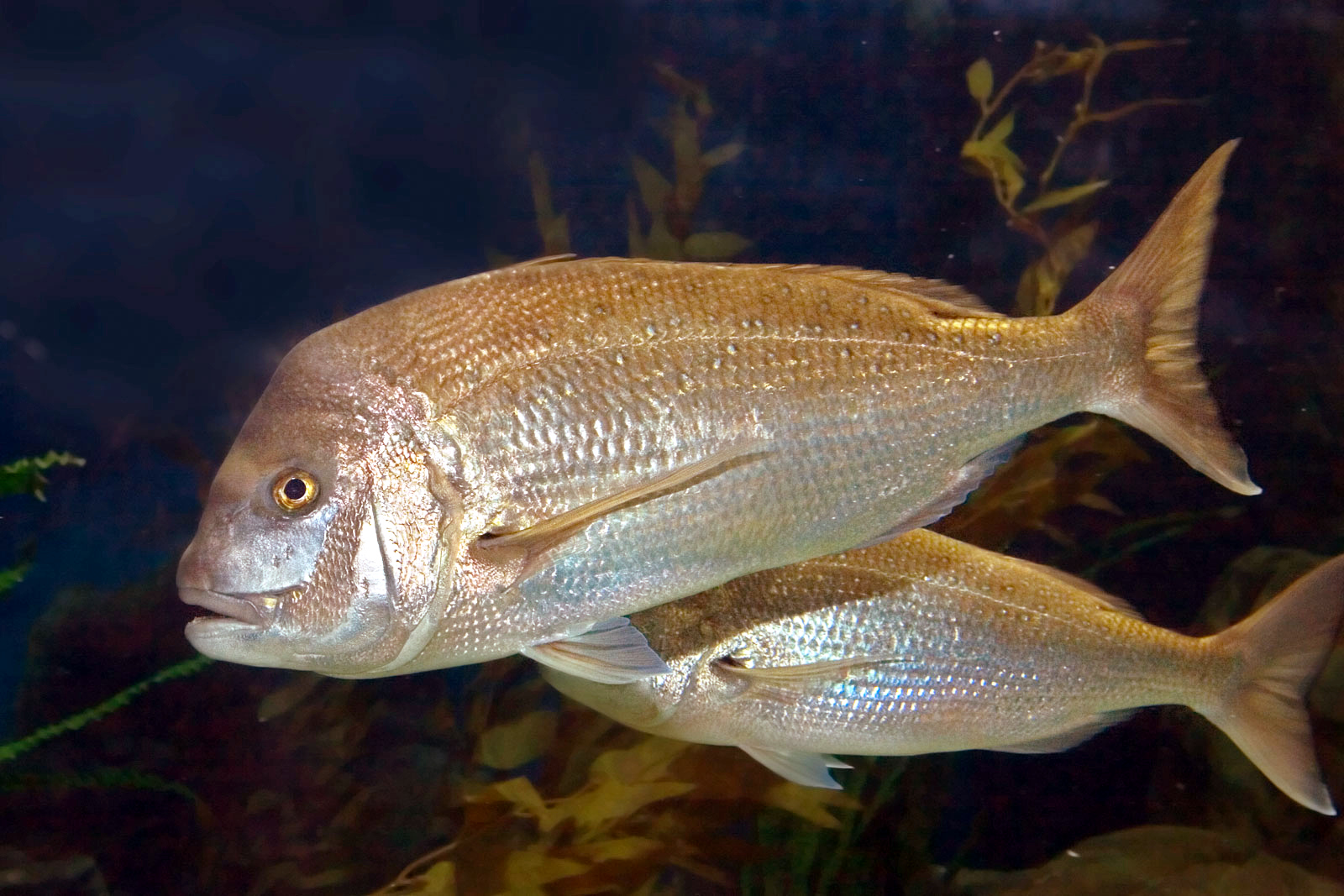
Fishing for snapper is popular off Curlew Island.

The waters off Curlew Island have been popular among fishermen since the late 1800s. Popular targeted fish include snapper and yellowtail kingfish. Fishing grounds are accessible by boat by launching from Port Augusta or Point Lowly. In March 1904, fishermen reported having unusual trouble with sharks near Curlew Island.
