= HMAS Koolonga =

1914 English-built cargo ship

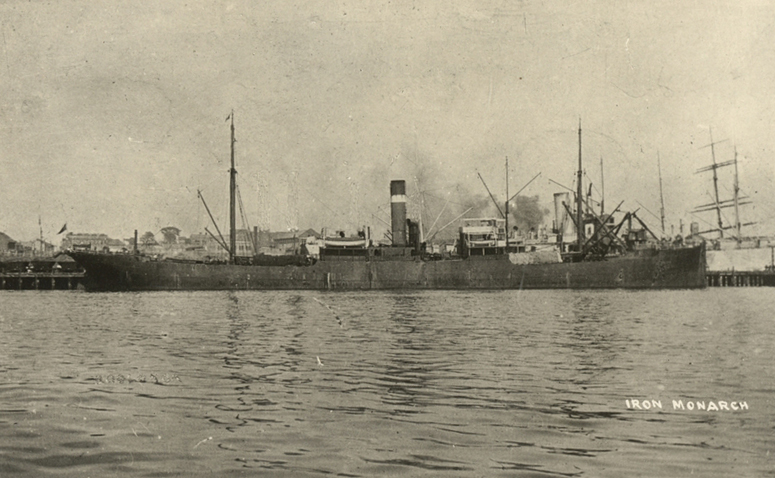
- Iron Monarch (formerly HMAS Koolonga)

History
- Name: Koolonga (1914, 1915–1917); Iron Monarch (1917–1937); Paz (1937–1941); Hatsu Maru (194?–1944)
- Owner: McIlwraith, McEacharn Line Pty Ltd, Melbourne (1914, 1915–1917)
- Builder: Sunderland Shipbuilding Company, South Dock Sunderland.
- Launched: 12 November 1913

Australia (RAN)
- Name: Koolonga
- Acquired: 1914
- Decommissioned: 1915

General characteristics
- Tonnage: 4,260 gross register tons, 2632 net register tons
- Length: 364 ft (111 m)
- Beam: 50.7 ft (15.5 m)
- Draught: 26.0 ft (7.9 m)
- Installed power: 344 nominal horsepower
- Propulsion: Single screw, Held triple expansion three cylinder engine

HMAS Koolonga was a 4,260 gross register tons cargo ship built by Sunderland Shipbuilding Company, South Dock Sunderland, England, in 1914 and bought by McIlwraith, McEacharn Line Pty Ltd, Melbourne and named SS Koolonga. She was requisitioned by the Royal Australian Navy on 6 August 1914, as a collier and supply ship. She was returned to her owners in late 1915. She was sold in 1937 to Madrigal & Company, Philippines and renamed Paz. She was sunk during the Second World War at Manila Bay in December 1941 and was later salvaged by the Imperial Japanese and renamed Hatsu Maru. While at anchor in Manila Bay, Philippines on 13 November 1944, she was attacked by United States Navy carrier aircraft and was sunk.

== RAN Service ==
Koolonga was requisitioned by the Royal Australian Navy on 6 August 1914, as a collier and supply ship, and commissioned as HMAS Koolonga. She participated during the Australian Naval and Military Expeditionary Force occupation of German New Guinea until May 1915 when she was later returned to her owners. She was awarded the battle honour Rabaul 1914.

== Australian coastal service ==
After being returned, she was employed on cargo trades from Whyalla, South Australia, to Newcastle, New South Wales.

She was sold in October 1917 through Scott Fell & Company, Newcastle to BHP Shipping and renamed Iron Monarch, before being sold again in 1920 to Interstate Steamships Ltd. Her tasks included transporting iron ore to the steel works at Port Kembla and coal to South Australia for the use of the Commonwealth Railway. On 18 April 1921, she ran aground at Port Pirie, South Australia; she was refloated on 21 April. She ran aground on Curlew Island near the head of Spencer's Gulf on 18 February 1930, once at Port Kembla, New South Wales, and at Cape Three Point, Broken Bay on 23 October 1937. Iron Monarch was seriously damaged on the Stockton breakwater at Newcastle on 26 November 1934 requiring repairs at Cockatoo Island Dockyard, Sydney, which cost £8,985.

In 1937, Iron Monarch sank a 28ft cutter in Port Lincoln harbour when it was drawn into her propeller. The cutter Sylvia had been returning from a picnic on nearby Grantham Island and approached the vessel while it was moving astern. She was sold later that year to Madrigal & Company, Philippines and renamed Paz.

== Fate ==
She was attacked by Japanese bombers and sunk on 26 December 1941 at Manila Bay during the Second World War. The wreck was salvaged, raised by the Imperial Japanese, and renamed Hatsu Maru. She served as an Imperial Japanese Army transport. On 13 November 1944, she was sunk after being bombed by United States Navy carrier based aircraft in Manila Bay, Philippines.
