= Director (1850 ship) =

American steamship

History

United States
- Name: Director
- Builder: Jeremiah Simonson (New York, NY)
- Launched: 1850
- Fate: Engine removed between 1864 and 1860. Ultimate fate is unknown.

General characteristics
- Displacement: 65 tons
- Length: 80 ft (24 m)
- Beam: 20 ft (6.1 m)
- Draft: 4.5 ft (1.4 m)
- Installed power: Square crosshead steam engine
- Propulsion: Side-mounted paddlewheels

Director was a wooden, side-wheel steamship built in 1850 specifically for the river and lake portions of Cornelius Vanderbilt's trans-Nicaragua shipping route. She was the first steam vessel to sail on Lake Nicaragua. She was not only significantly profitable for Vanderbilt, but having proved the transcontinental route viable, changed both Central American and United States history. Her success produced investments in newer, more capable ships and she was retired sometime between 1854 and 1856.

== Construction and characteristics ==
Director was commissioned by Cornelius Vanderbilt. She was built by Jeremiah Simonson at his shipyard in New York. Simonson was Vanderbilt's nephew, having been born to his sister, Mary Polly Vanderbilt. Director was 80 feet (24 m) long, with a beam of 20 feet (6.1 m) and a draft of 4.5 feet (1.4 m). She displaced 65 tons. The ship was launched on June 11, 1850. She had a single square crosshead steam engine built by the Allaire Works. Her boilers were intended to be coal-fired, but due to the lack of local coal supplies, they burned wood while sailing Lake Nicaragua. An 1856 inventory of company property showed 217 cords of wood on hand for steamer use.

== Reaching Lake Nicaragua (1850 - 1851) ==
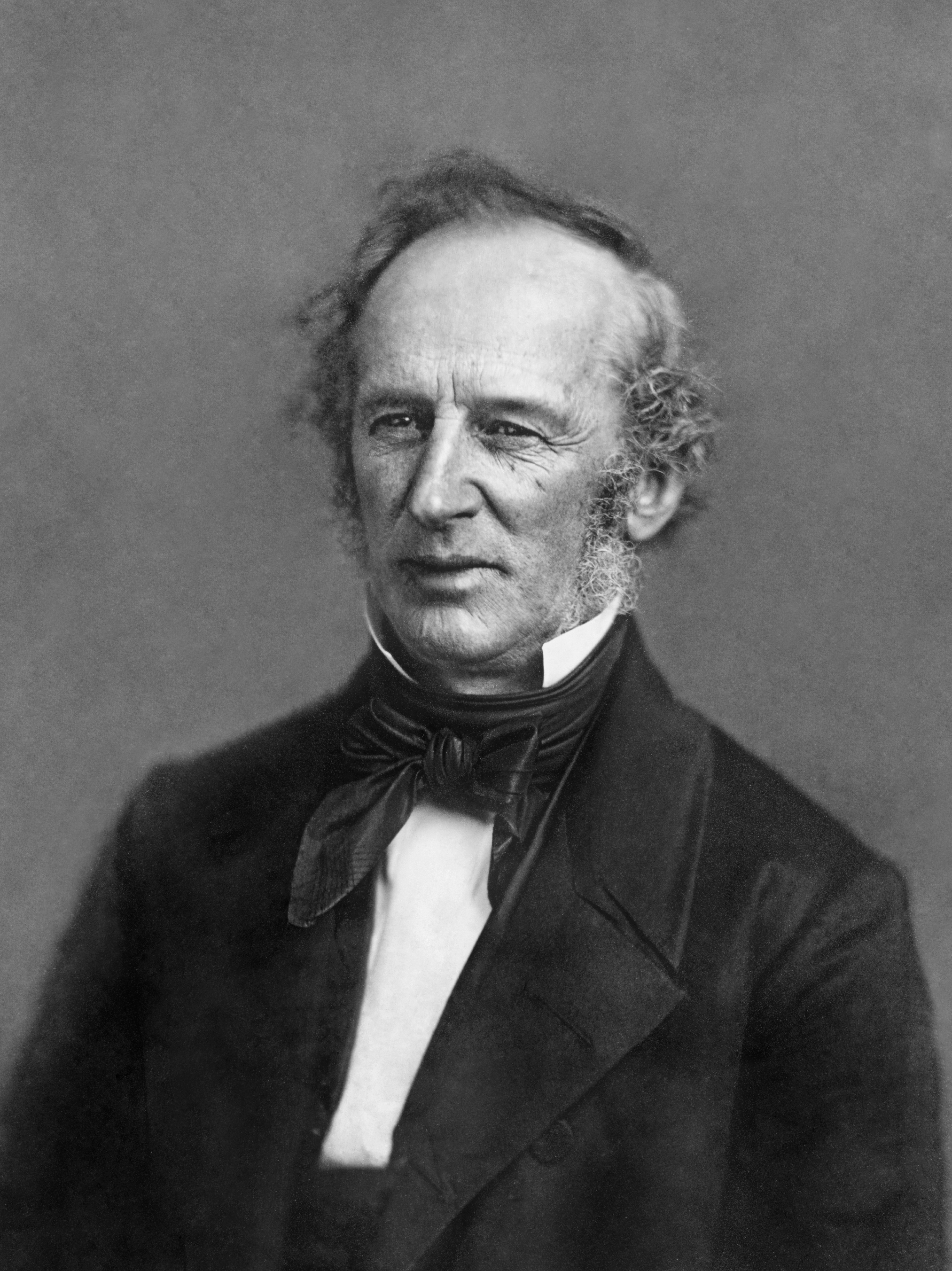
Cornelius Vanderbilt

The California gold rush resulted in large demand for travel to California. The shortest sea route from the East Coast to California at the time was through Panama. It was an effective monopoly with the U.S. Mail Steamship Company running to the Atlantic side of the isthmus, and the Pacific Mail Steamship Company running from Panama to San Francisco. The monopoly kept rates high, so Cornelius Vanderbilt pioneered a new route from New York to San Francisco across Nicaragua, at least 500 miles shorter than the route across Panama. The Nicaraguan government granted the Accessory Transit Company, controlled by Vanderbilt, the right to build a canal and pending its construction, a monopoly on transporting passengers across the country. Vanderbilt's ocean-going steamships were to sail from New York to San Juan de Nicaragua on the Caribbean coast of Nicaragua, and from the San Juan de Sur on the Pacific Coast to San Francisco.

Director was intended to meet ships arriving on the Caribbean coast and carry their passengers and freight up the San Juan River. At the headwaters of the San Juan, she would meet the larger steamer Orus which would take them across Lake Nicaragua. From there, stage coach and mule train would complete the final fifteen miles to the Pacific coast. With that plan in mind, Director cleared out of the port of New York, bound for San Juan de Nicaragua on July 11, 1850. She stopped at Lewes, Delaware on July 20, 1850 to take refuge from a storm, then at Hampton Roads, Virginia, finally arriving at Charleston, South Carolina on July 23, 1850, where she took on coal and made repairs. She sailed from Charleston on July 31, 1850. She stopped next in Key West, Florida on August 8, 1850 before arriving in Nicaragua on August 22, 1850.

The United Kingdom had territorial claims in Central America, including British Honduras, the Mosquito Coast of Nicaragua, and the Bay Islands, now part of Honduras. It regarded the flood of Americans into the region and Vanderbilt's canal deal as threatening both to those claims and to its naval power were such a canal open to American ships but denied to British ones. Negotiations between the governments produced the Clayton-Bulwer Treaty in April 1850, but tensions were still high when Director reached Nicaragua in August. The British consul at Greytown, the small settlement at San Juan de Nicaragua, was assisted by the British brig of war Persian in harassing the crew and passengers to underline Britain's sovereignty over the coast. Director was boarded by a party of Royal Marines led by the 1st lieutenant of the Persian. The passengers aboard the ship were required to give up their arms. The Persian's commander informed Director's captain that if he attempted to head up river without the permission of the British consul, that the little steamer would be fired upon. To enforce this threat, Persian moved to within 100 yards (91 m) of Director, bringing her effectively under Persian's guns. Having no real choice in the matter, Director's captain did apply for permission, which was granted after some minor delays. Americans viewed this behavior on the part of the British as insulting and contrary to the terms of the recently signed treaty.

Orus and Director attempted to ascend the San Juan River together, supporting each other. As Orus was unable to cross the shallow bar at the mouth of the San Juan, the two vessels focused on entering the Colorado River, a southern offshoot of the San Juan. Orus was stopped again at Machuca Rapids, where Director joined her in September 1850. Engineers spent several weeks blasting rocky shoals to clear a passage for the larger Orus. The attempt was made on November 9, 1850. After almost reaching the end of the rapids, Orus' crew lost control of the vessel and she was swept back down the rapids and wrecked in three feet of water.

With some difficulty, Director crossed the Machuca Rapids and anchored just below the next shallow spot, El Castillo Rapids. Once again engineers blasted the shoals for several weeks to clear the way. Hawsers were run to trees on shore and Director was winched over the rapids. She cleared the final shoal, Toro Rapids, and from here it was clear sailing. On January 1, 1851, after months struggling up the San Juan River, Director sailed out onto Lake Nicaragua. She arrived in Granada to an ecstatic welcome. Church bells rang in celebration. She was the first steamship to sail the lake. Prefect Fermin Ferrer reported to Nicaraguan President Norberto Ramirez:

Today, the first day of January, 1851, a new era dawns for Nicaragua, already on her way to a future of prosperity and happiness. --At sunrise this memorable and joyful day, the steamer Director appeared, cutting through the waters of the lake towards the city...This beautiful vessel brought the Central American flag on her bow, and the North American flag abaft, saluting each other...The entire population of Granada thronged to the beach, and dizzy with delight admired for the first time this ingenious mechanism developed in the present century. The obstacles of the river have been overcome by human skill, and a mysterious coincidence has brought the steamer Director to our shores this day, to herald to us that the happiness and fortunes of Nicaragua date from January 1st, 1851, the first day of the second half of the nineteenth century.

Jeremiah Simonson built Vanderbilt another vessel for the Nicaragua route, this one an ocean-going steamer to connect New York City to Nicaragua. The 1,409 ton steamer Prometheus was launched on August 3, 1850. Vanderbilt himself was aboard for Prometheus' first trip to Nicaragua, which left New York on December 26, 1850. She stopped in Havana, Cuba on January 2, 1851, and left again on January 3. Prometheus arrived at San Juan de Nicaragua on January 7, 1851 One modern-day biography of Vanderbilt says that, upon arriving in Nicaragua, the Commodore himself piloted Director up the San Juan River. This cannot be true. Director's successful ascent occurred while Vanderbilt was still at sea en route to Nicaragua. It seems more likely that Vanderbilt ascended the San Juan on Sir Henry L. Bulwer, yet another vessel built by Simonson for the Nicaragua route.

== Vanderbilt's Nicaragua route (1851 - 1856) ==
By the middle of 1851 business was humming on Vanderbilt's Nicaragua route. San Juan de Nicaragua had been declared a free port, reducing British harassment of through passengers. Vanderbilt steamers arrived from New York and their passengers were carried upriver on Sir Henry L. Bulwer to El Castillo Rapids. From there they ascended in canoes to Toro Rapids from whence Director carried them to the west side of Lake Nicaragua. A fifteen-mile carriage road took them the Pacific coast, where they could sail to San Francisco on another Vanderbilt steamer. On her second trip on the lake, Director was reported to have carried 200 passengers. She made two trips per week and in January, her first month on the lake, her revenue was reported to be $32,000. In one year 24,000 passengers traveled the route. While profitable for Vanderbilt, this influx of Americans and the money they spent destabilized Nicaragua and neighboring countries.

Wealth from the California gold fields flowed back over the Nicaragua route. Vanderbilt's Pacific left San Francisco on July 15, 1851 and arrived at San Juan de Sud, Nicaragua two weeks later, on July 29. A short carriage ride connected to Director, which ferried passengers and freight across Lake Nicaragua and connected with Sir Henry L. Bulwer. At San Juan de Nicaragua, they were embarked on Prometheus which arrived in New York on August 13, 1851. Among her 260 passengers was $578,579 in gold dust.

Political instability in Nicaragua unleashed by Vanderbilt's business burst out in 1851. On August 4, revolutionary forces seized Director at Leon. While this revolution quickly lost steam, it was just the first of several similar events to threaten the Accessory Transit Company. Another danger loomed in November, 1851. River currents carried Director into the rapids as she headed downstream. As the vessel appeared ready to capsize, a number of people jumped overboard and seven were drowned. Director was saved, however, and continued her sailings.

As the Nicaragua route flourished, Vanderbilt built additional shallow-draft steamers for service on Lake Nicaragua and the San Juan River. Central America and Ometepe became the main lake steamers. By November 1853 and until at least July 1854 Director is reported to have been relegated to replacing the canoes on the eleven miles between Toro Rapids and El Castillo Rapids. Two years later she was retired. An 1856 inventory of company property lists separately, "One wooden hull, formerly the steamer Director" and "One steam engine (square cross head) formerly belonging to the steamer Director". It appears that sometime between 1854 and 1856, Director's machinery was removed. The ultimate fate of the wooden hulk and engine is unknown.
