= Henry Eckford =

Henry Eckford may refer to:

== People ==
- Henry Eckford (horticulturist) (1823–1905), British horticulturist
- Henry Eckford (shipbuilder) (1775–1832), Scottish-born American shipbuilder and naval architect

== Ships ==
- Henry Eckford (steamboat), American commercial steamboat in service from 1824 to 1841; the first steam vessel to be powered by a compound engine
- USNS Henry Eckford (T-AO-192), a fleet replenishment oiler of the United States Navy launched in 1989 but never completed and sold for scrapping in 2011
