= T. F. Secor =

American marine engineer

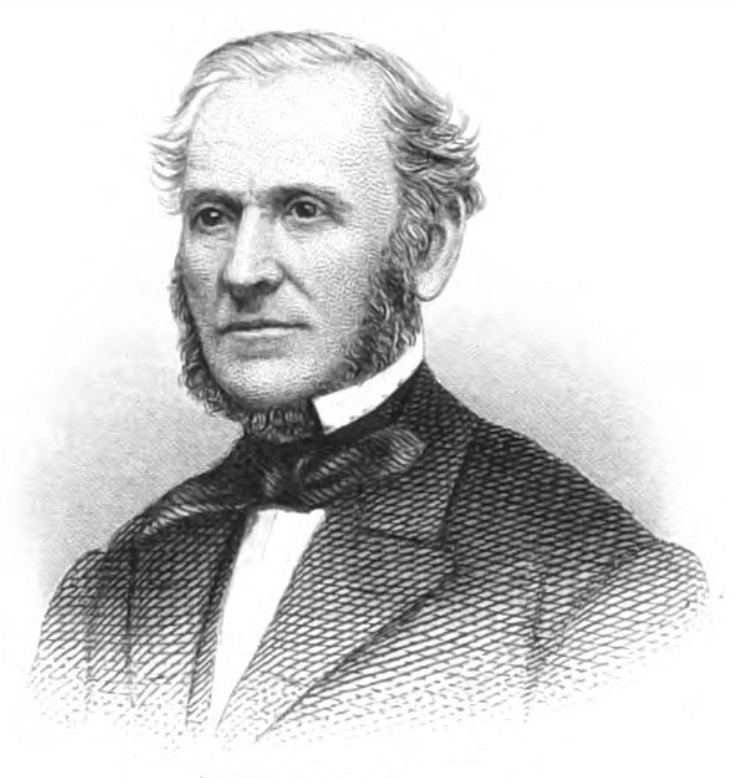
- Born: Theodosius Fowler Secord (Note: T. F. Secor and his brothers dropped the "d" from their surname at some point.); March 22, 1808; Eastchester, New York
- Died: April 29, 1901 (aged 93); Brooklyn, New York
- Occupation: Marine engineer
- Years active: 1822–1867
- Known for: Co-founder of T. F. Secor & Co. (Morgan Iron Works), 1838–1850; Co-proprietor and manager of the Allaire Iron Works, 1850–1867

Signature
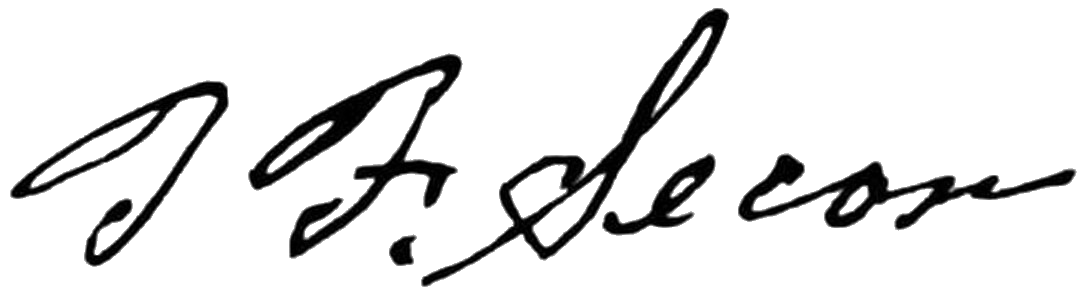

Theodosius Fowler Secor (March 22, 1808 – April 29, 1901) was an American marine engineer. Secor co-founded T. F. Secor & Co. in New York in 1838 (better known by its later name, the Morgan Iron Works), which was one of the leading American marine engineering facilities of its day. In 1850, he sold his stake in the company to his erstwhile partner, Charles Morgan, in order to go into partnership with Cornelius Vanderbilt in the purchase of another leading New York marine engineering facility, the Allaire Iron Works.

Under Secor's management, T. F. Secor & Co., and later the Allaire Works, produced the engines for some of the largest and fastest steamers of their day, from early Hudson River "crack" (Note: A "crack" steamboat is one that excels in performance (in the same way that "crack shot" or "crack troops" etc. refer to those in the highest performance bracket).) boats such as Troy and Thomas Powell to the later "palace" steamers New World and Drew. The Allaire Works under his leadership also built the engines for many oceangoing vessels, and during the American Civil War, built the engines for seven United States Navy warships. Secor continued as manager of the Allaire Works until its closure in 1867 during the long postwar slump, when he retired from business. The value of his estate at the time of his death in 1901 was in excess of $1,000,000 (equivalent to $38,700,000 in 2025).

== Life and career ==
Theodosius Fowler Secor was born on March 22, 1808, in Eastchester, New York, to Oliver Secord, a carpenter, millwright and farmer, and his wife Jane (née Pease); Theodosius was the eldest of a number of children. The Secor side of the family had French Huguenot roots, having been established in the United States through one of two brothers who settled in New Rochelle, New York, in 1666.

=== Education and early career ===
Secor's family moved to New York City when he was a boy, where he received a "fair" education. As the family was of limited means, Secor left school at fourteen years of age to become an employee of a grocery store. At the age of sixteen, he secured a machinist's apprenticeship at the Allaire Iron Works, a leading New York marine steam engineering works. During his apprenticeship, which lasted five years, he showed sufficient aptitude to be given supervision of important jobs, such as assembly of marine engines on the company's wharves. Soon after completing his training, he was dispatched by the company to Charleston, South Carolina, to oversee the assembly of steam engines there, and then to Havana, Cuba for the assembly of engines and machinery for a number of sugar mills. These early experiences gave Secor many contacts with steamboat owners, captains and engineers, as well as planters and manufacturers, which he would later turn to his advantage.

=== T. F. Secor & Co. ===
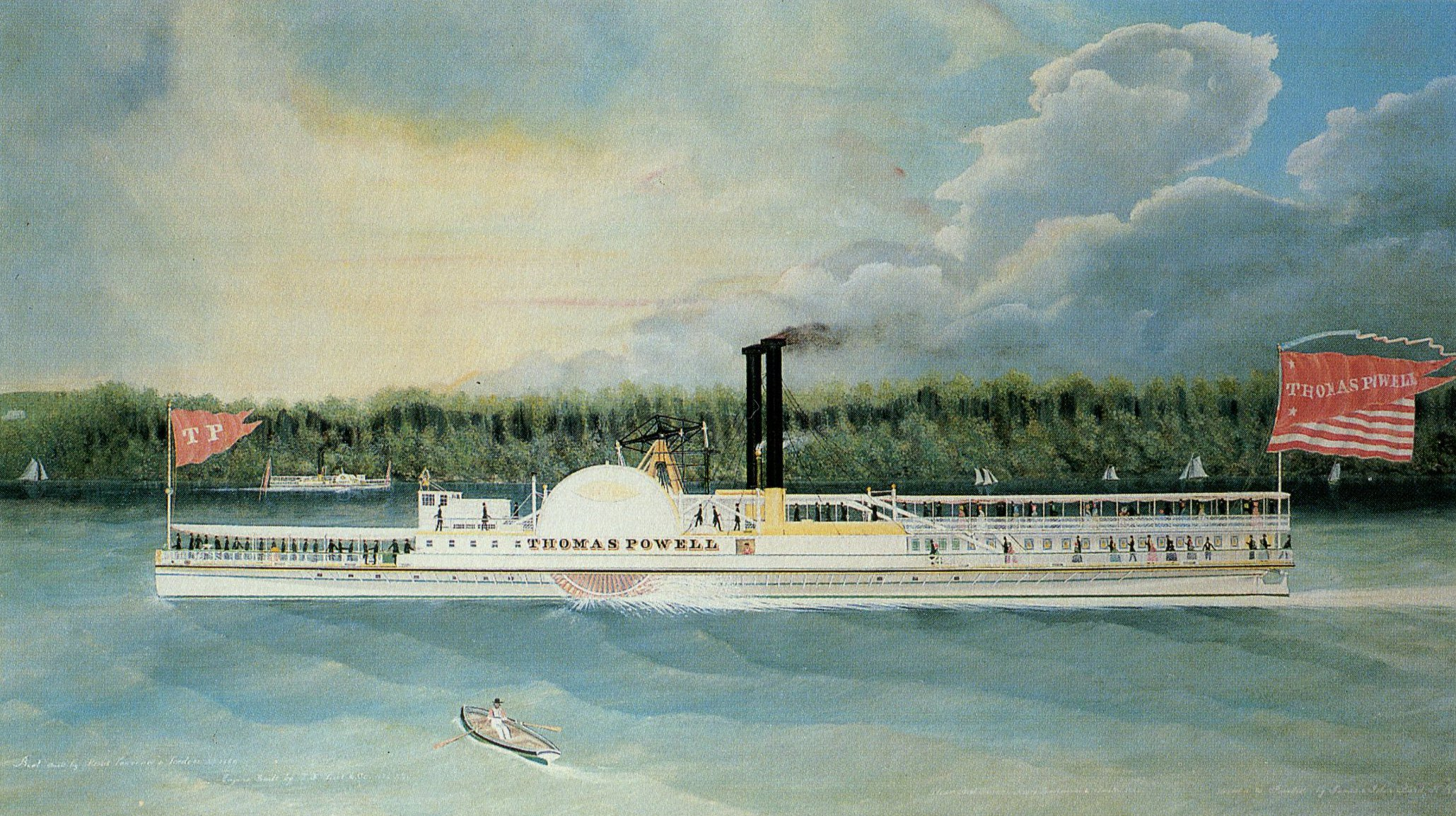
The "crack" steamer Thomas Powell

In September 1836, Secor established his own small business, a workshop in Washington Street, near Morris Street, in New York City. In 1838, he formed a partnership with future transport magnate Charles Morgan and William K. Caulkin to co-found the marine engineering firm of T. F. Secor & Co at the foot of Ninth Street, New York. The firm quickly established itself as one of the city's leading marine engine manufacturers, constructing engines for some of the "crack" boats of the 1840s, such as Troy, Thomas Powell and the mammoth steamer New World, which were among the fastest and most popular Hudson River steamboats then in service. From an early date, Secor is also said to have built all the engines, and done all the repair work, for Cornelius Vanderbilt's growing fleet of steamers. By 1846, the company had outgrown its plant to such an extent that the owners purchased the entire city block bounded by Ninth and Tenth Streets, Avenue D and the East River to expand their operations. At its peak, the company employed between 500 and 700 men.

=== Allaire Iron Works ===
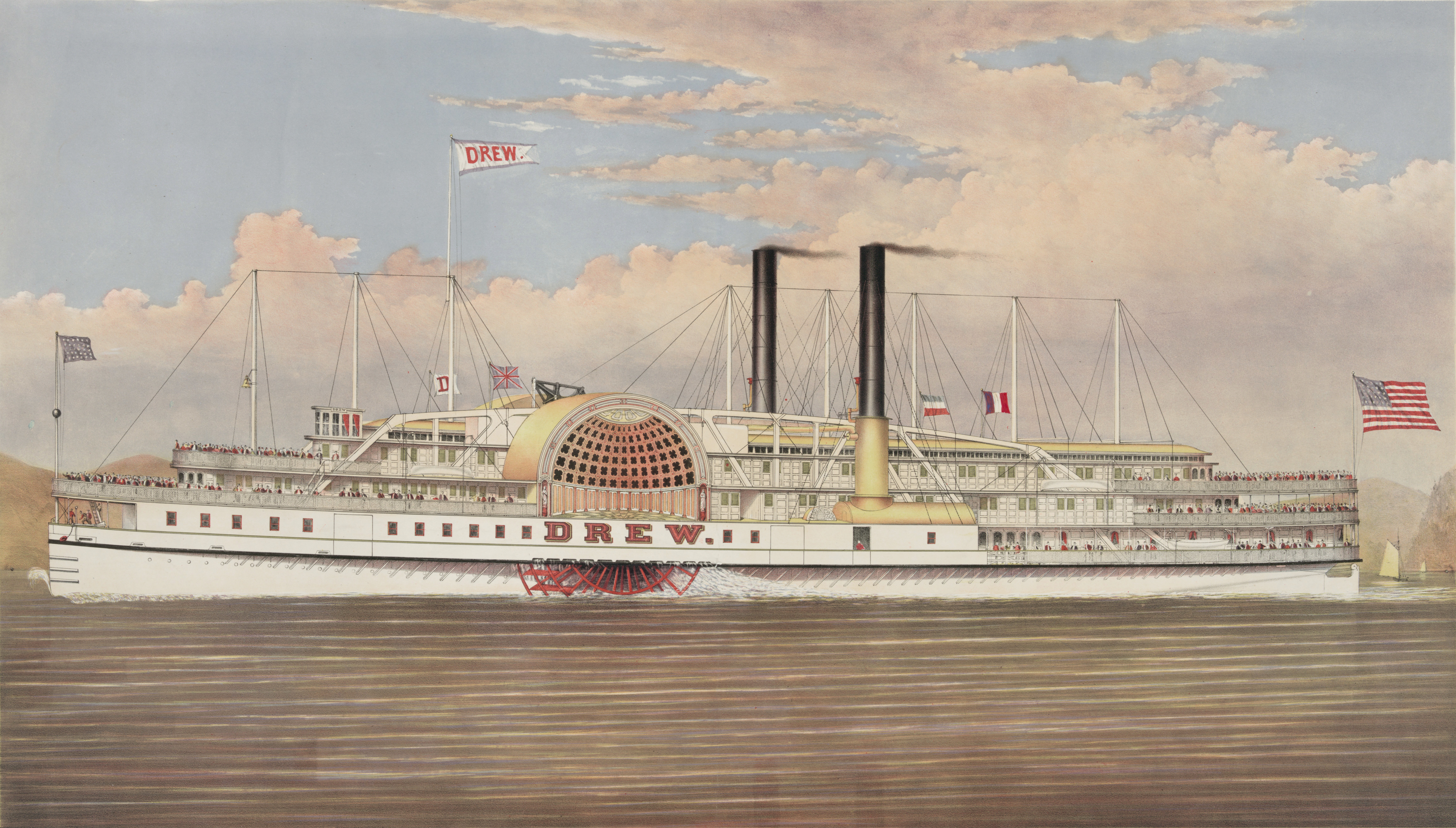
The "palace" steamer Drew

In 1850, Secor sold his holdings in T. F. Secor & Co. to Morgan, who renamed the plant the Morgan Iron Works. Secor subsequently joined forces with Cornelius Vanderbilt to acquire the Allaire Works—where Secor had served his apprenticeship—the two men reportedly taking an equal stake in the company. Secor became the plant's manager, and under his supervision, engines for some of the most celebrated steam vessels of the era were produced, including those for St. John, Dean Richmond and Drew, the largest Hudson River steamboats of their day.

==== American Civil War ====
During the American Civil War, the Allaire Works under Secor's supervision produced the engines for seven United States Navy warships, among them, engines for two gunboats of the early Unadilla class and two for the later Sassacus class. The engines of the former, which were designed by the navy's chief engineer Benjamin F. Isherwood, were heavily criticized for their lack of speed, and Isherwood ensured the engines for the latter class would be much more powerful. The largest engines built for the navy by the Allaire Works during the war were those for the ironclad Puritan and the screw frigate Madawaska. Puritan, however, was still under construction by the war's end and was consequently never completed, while the engines of Madawaska, designed by John Ericsson and intended to make her the fastest ship afloat, proved a failure. A number of merchant vessels engined by the Allaire Works were also taken into service by the navy during the war. (Note: For example, USS Fort Jackson and USS Shokokon)

After the war, a severe and prolonged shipbuilding slump, caused by the oversupply of shipping produced during the conflict, forced many New York shipbuilders and marine engine manufacturers out of business, including the Allaire Works, which liquidated its assets in 1867. Secor, though not yet sixty years of age, subsequently went into retirement.

=== Personal details ===
Secor's first marriage, on April 13, 1829, was to Mary E. Curtis of Stratford, Connecticut, daughter of a shoe manufacturer. The couple had several children together. After Mary's death in 1869, Secor was married a second time, on November 18, 1875, to Sarah M. Husted, daughter of Augustus W. Husted, "a representative of one of the oldest families in Greenwich", Connecticut. In his retirement, Secor moved to Greenwich, where he purchased and made improvements to the A. W. Husted homestead.

Secor's character was described as "steadfast and irreproachable", and he was said to be "gentle and approachable" in manner. Though affiliated with the Democratic Party, he was "in no sense a politician".

Secor's health began to fail in his final year, and after an illness of about three months, he died at the age of 93 in Brooklyn, New York, on April 29, 1901; he is said to have retained his "strong intellect" until a few days before the end. Secor outlived all his siblings, and all his children except one, Mrs Sarah Jane Miller; he was also survived by his second wife. He left an estate valued in excess of $1,000,000 (equivalent to $38,700,000 in 2025). He was buried in Woodlawn Cemetery, New York.
