= Allaire Iron Works =

19th-century marine engineering company in New York City

- Type: Private
- Industry: Engineering and shipbuilding
- Founded: 1816
- Founder: James P. Allaire
- Defunct: 1869
- Headquarters: New York City, United States
- Products: Marine steam engines, metal castings
- Total assets: $300,000 (1842/1859)
- Owner: James P. Allaire (1816-1850); Cornelius Vanderbilt (1850-1869)
- Number of employees: 1859: 500; 1863: 850

The Allaire Iron Works was a leading 19th-century American marine engineering company based in New York City. Founded in 1816 by engineer and philanthropist James P. Allaire, the Allaire Works was one of the world's first companies dedicated to the construction of marine steam engines, supplying the engines for more than 50% of all the early steamships built in the United States.

James P. Allaire retired from the company in 1850 when it was taken over by Cornelius Vanderbilt. During Vanderbilt's ownership, the Allaire Iron Works made a significant contribution to the Union cause during the American Civil War. Following the war, the Allaire Works, like many other American marine engineering companies, fell on hard times, and in 1869 it was wound up, whereupon its equipment was purchased by John Roach, who also hired its best employees for his own company, the Morgan Iron Works.

Amongst the many notable achievements of the Allaire Works, it supplied the engine cylinder for the first steamship to cross the Atlantic, Savannah, pioneered the use of the compound engine in steamships, and built the engines for two winners of the coveted Blue Riband. The company also supplied the engines for at least 17 U.S. Navy warships during the American Civil War.

== Background ==
James Peter Allaire founded his first company, a brass foundry, at 466 Cherry Street, New York, in 1804. In 1807, Allaire received an order from steamboat pioneer Robert Fulton for brass fittings for the North River Steamboat, the world's first commercially successful steam-powered vessel. Allaire and Fulton struck up a friendship, and Allaire provided fittings for later vessels built by Fulton.

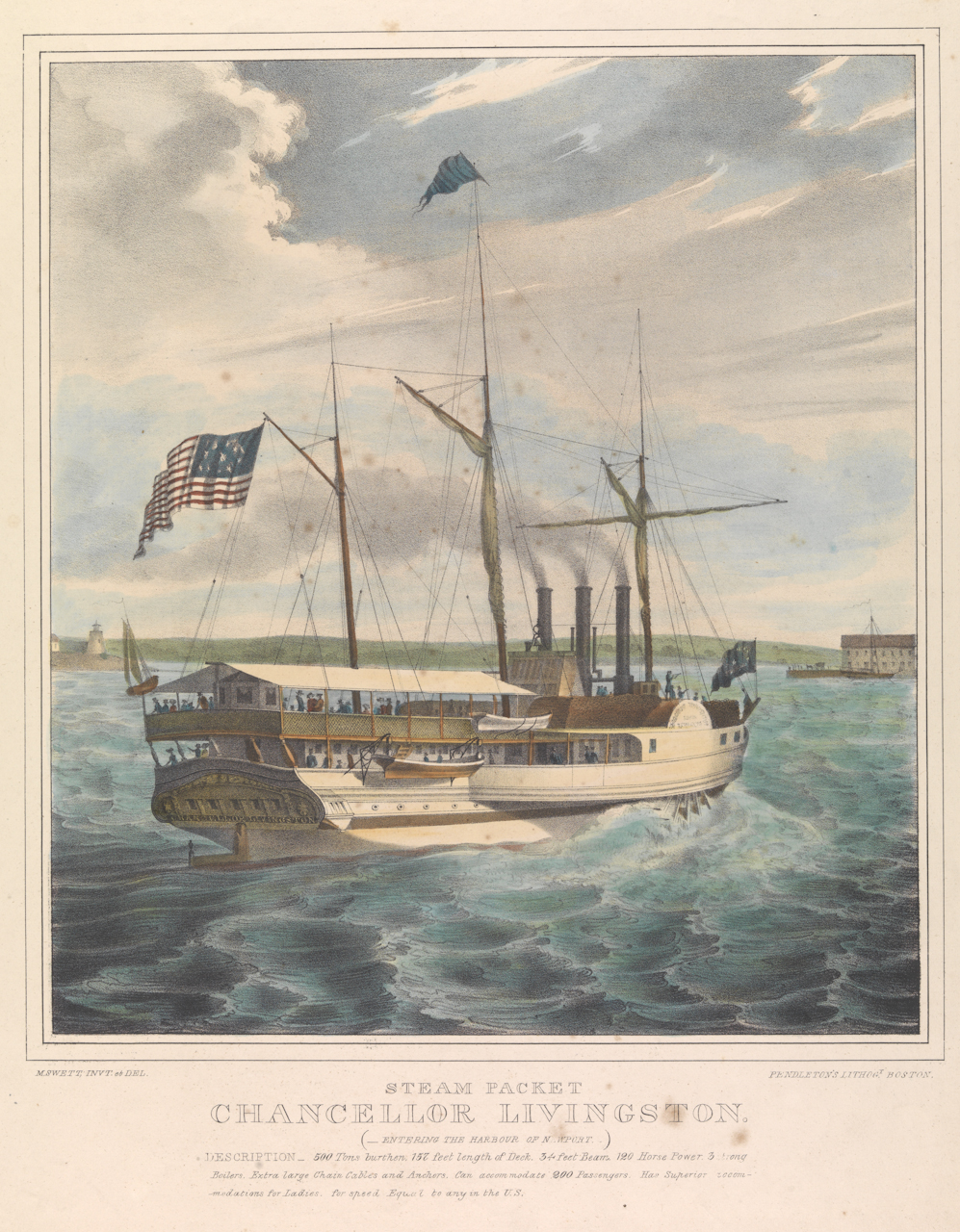
The Steam packet Chancellor Livingston entering the harbour of Newport

Following Fulton's death in 1815, Allaire leased his plant and equipment from the Fulton and Livingstone families, and entered a partnership with Fulton's chief engineer, Charles Stoudinger. Allaire and Stoudinger built the engine and boiler for the last steamboat contracted for by the Fulton shop, the Chancellor Livingstone, which was completed about a year later.

Stoudinger himself died shortly after completion of Chancellor Livingstone, after which Allaire decided to move Fulton's equipment from its location in New Jersey to his brassworks at Cherry St., New York. With the consolidation of his business at the Cherry St. plant, Allaire renamed it the Allaire Iron Works.

== Allaire ownership, 1816-1850 ==
=== Early period, 1816-1822 ===
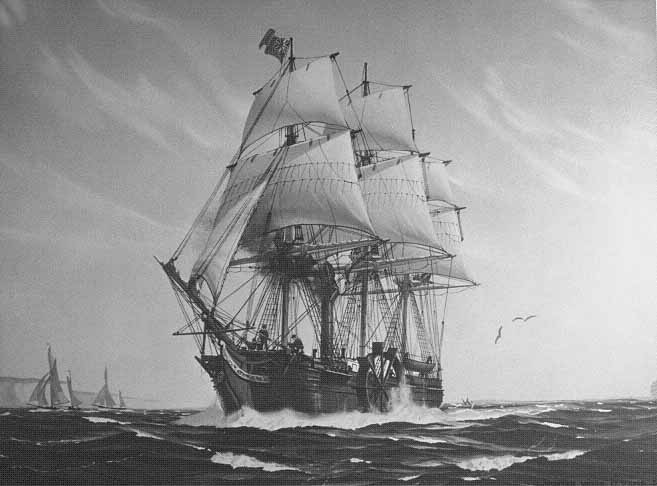
Artist's impression of Savannah

In 1817, the Allaire Iron Works supplied the engine cylinder for Savannah, the first steamship to make a transatlantic crossing. The cylinder, one of the largest then built, had a diameter of 40 inches (1,000 mm), while the piston had a stroke of 5 feet. Savannah was not a commercial success, and following her return voyage from Europe, her engine was removed and sold to Allaire.

In 1819, the Allaire Works supplied the engine for Robert Fulton, the first steamship to enter service along the United States coastline (as opposed to working the inland waterways). This engine had a 44-inch-diameter (110 cm) cylinder and a stroke of 5 feet. Robert Fulton helped to demonstrate that steamships were capable of reliable seagoing service. Other engines built in this period by the Allaire Works include those for United States—a 140-foot steamer said to be the first American steamboat to issue tickets (rather than "way-bills") to passengers—and for James Kent, North Carolina, South Carolina and other Hudson River steamers.

=== Howell Works ===
As Allaire's business grew, he found it increasingly difficult to source adequate amounts of quality pig iron from which to manufacture his engines. The best quality pig iron was imported from Britain, but high tariffs made it uneconomic to use. The pig iron industry in the United States was at this time still in its infancy, and producing neither the quality nor quantity of pig iron required.

The only solution was for Allaire to become a manufacturer of pig iron himself. In 1822, in response to a recommendation from a friend, Allaire purchased 7,000 acres (28 km^{2}) of land in Monmouth County, New Jersey, which contained a furnace used for manufacturing pig iron from the natural resource of bog iron. Allaire renamed the furnace the Howell Works, and over the next 20 years used it to source most of his pig iron, during which time Howell Works grew to be a substantial and largely self-sufficient community, complete with its own church, school, company store and farmland.

=== Pioneering compound engines, 1820s ===
In 1824, the Allaire Works built the engine for the steamboat Henry Eckford, the first steam vessel in the world fitted with a compound engine. The high-pressure cylinder was 12 inches (300 mm) in diameter and the low-pressure cylinder 24 inches (610 mm), with both having a stroke of 4 feet. In the same year, the Allaire Works also supplied a compound engine for a 200-ton towboat called Post Boy, and another for a small steamer, Linnaeus.

Other vessels equipped with compound engines from the Allaire Works to 1828 included Sun, Commerce, Swiftsure and Pilot Boy. The Allaire Works built compound engines decades before the advantages of such engines became widely recognized in the shipbuilding industry.

=== Growth and financial problems, 1830s-1850 ===
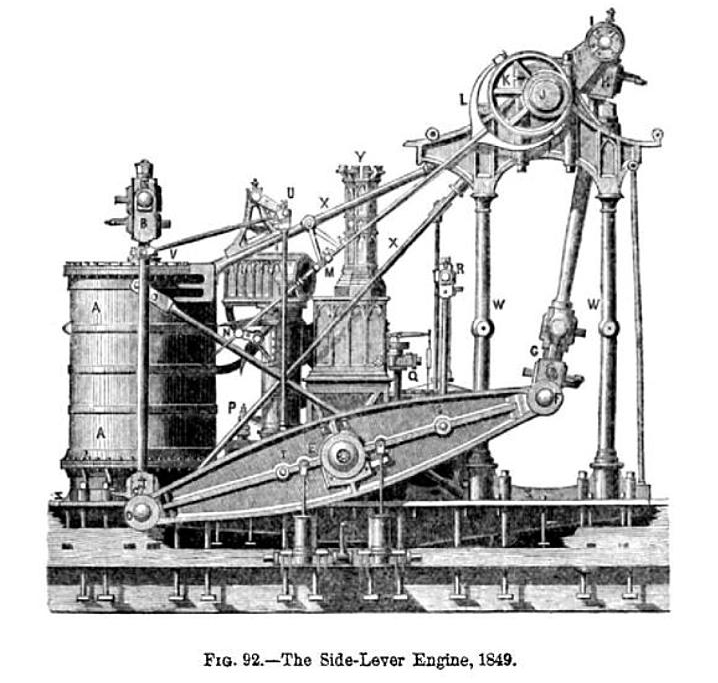
A side-lever engine built by the Allaire Iron Works in 1849 for the transatlantic steamer Pacific

In the 1830s, the Allaire business empire reached the peak of its expansion. The Howell Works in New Jersey was producing a surplus of pig iron, enabling Allaire to diversify into the manufacture of household goods in addition to his production of marine engines in New York. Ships supplied with Allaire-built engines in this period included Frank, New Haven, Rhode Island and Massachusetts. Massachusetts, then the largest ship operating on Long Island Sound, was driven by a pair of beam engines.

Allaire had also accumulated considerable interest in steamships by this time. In 1836, a ship in which Allaire was part-owner, William Gibbons, ran aground and was destroyed. In the same year, the Howell Works furnace blew out and production there temporarily ceased. The following year, the Panic of 1837 plunged America into a severe recession, and later that year, the steamboat Home, wholly owned by Allaire and largely uninsured, sank with the loss of 100 lives, damaging Allaire's reputation and leaving him short of capital.

Allaire had up until this point in his career been able to borrow to meet cash shortfalls, but with the recession affecting demand for his products, he was obliged to look elsewhere for working capital. In 1842, he sold shares in the Allaire Iron Works, which was incorporated for the sum of $300,000. Shipping magnate Cornelius Vanderbilt and Allaire's brother-in-law John Haggerty were thus able to eventually gain a controlling interest in the company.

With the capital infusion from incorporation, the Allaire Iron Works remained productive through the 1840s. In this period, engines were supplied for steamboats such as Isaac Newton in 1846, C. Vanderbilt in 1847, and Commodore in 1848 (the names for the latter two reflecting Vanderbilt's growing influence in the company). Engines were also supplied for the sister ships Bay State and Empire State in 1846–47, the former of which was the fastest boat on Long Island Sound for some years. In 1849–50, the Allaire Works supplied the engines for two of the original four Collins Line steamers, Pacific and Baltic. The engines for these two vessels were of the side-lever type, with Pacific having a 95-inch (2,400 mm) cylinder and 9-foot stroke, and Baltic a 96-inch (2,400 mm) cylinder and 10 foot stroke. Both ships were to become Blue Riband winners by setting speed records for transatlantic crossings.

== Vanderbilt ownership, 1850-1869 ==
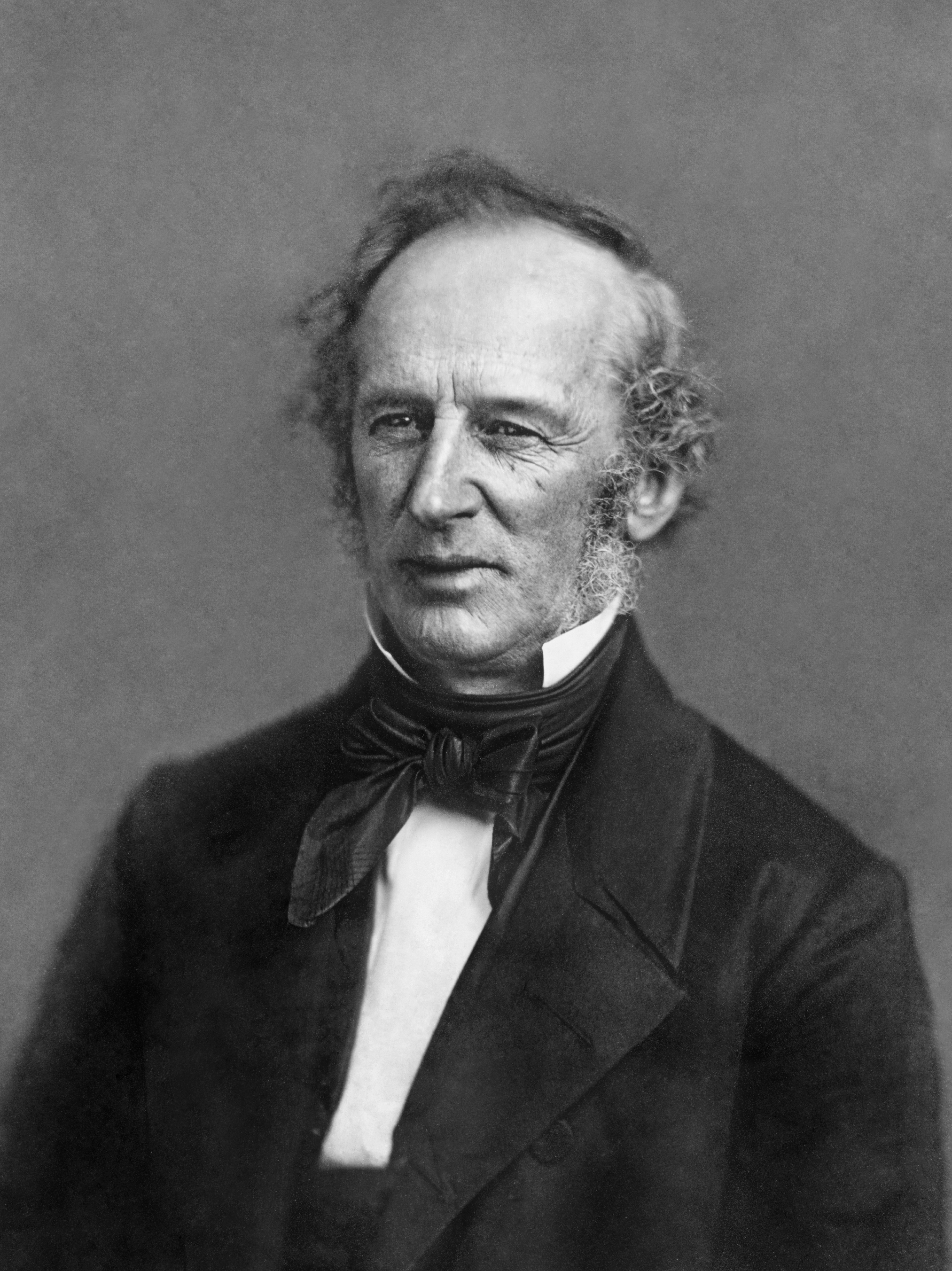
Transport magnate Cornelius Vanderbilt gained control of the Allaire Works in 1850

=== Vanderbilt takeover ===
In 1850, James P. Allaire retired from the Presidency of the Allaire Iron Works—according to one report, through the machinations of his brother-in-law John Haggerty, who may have been scandalized by the former's marriage to a young woman 26 years his junior in 1846. Cornelius Vanderbilt subsequently gained control of the company, appointing T. F. Secor, former proprietor of T. F. Secor & Co., as its manager.

After the Vanderbilt takeover, an increasing percentage of the company's contracts came from Vanderbilt himself, who from this point had most of his new steamboats and steamships engined there, just as most of his shipbuilding contracts went to the same firm, that of his trusted nephew, Jeremiah Simonson. Vanderbilt brought his own ideas to the field of marine steam engineering. Defying the prevailing wisdom, he began powering oceangoing steamships with American walking beam engines, believing that their relative lightness of construction, economy of operation and low maintenance requirements made them preferable to the low center-of-gravity, but more complex, British-designed side-lever and oscillating types. Other American marine engine manufacturers quickly followed his example, and walking beams became the preferred engine type for oceangoing American sidewheel steamships until the introduction of the much more economical surface condensing compound engine in the early 1870s. (Note: Also see, for example, the manufacturing records of the Morgan Iron Works (Baughman, pp. 242-245), or of other major U.S. marine engine manufacturers.)

During the 1850s, the Allaire Works supplied engines to such notable ships as Buckeye State in 1850—only the second ship on the Great Lakes to be fitted with a compound engine—and the 3,360-ton Vanderbilt, whose twin 90-inch (2,300 mm) cylinder beam engines were believed to make her the fastest oceangoing ship operating from New York upon launch in 1856. Other ships fitted with Allaire powerplants in this period include North Star (1853), a transatlantic ocean liner, St. Lawrence (1853), built for operation on the Great Lakes, and the Long Island Sound steamer Plymouth Rock (1854).

=== American Civil War ===
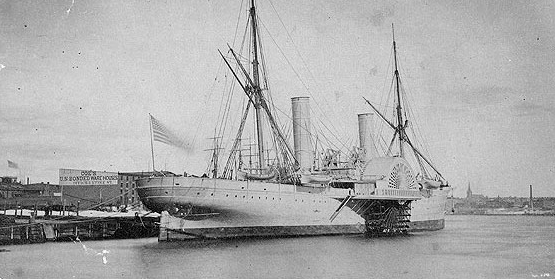
The 3,360-ton steamer USS Vanderbilt, in port during the Civil War. Vanderbilt's size, speed and range made her an ideal hunter for the Confederate Raider CSS Alabama, but she never located her prey.

The Allaire Iron Works made a substantial contribution to the Union cause during the American Civil War, providing the engines for at least seven warships, while at least another ten merchant ships with Allaire engines were purchased or chartered by the U.S. Navy and converted into warships.

In 1861, the Allaire Works built the engines for two of the 700 ton Unadilla class or "90-day" gunboats, USS Penobscot and USS Winona. The following year, the company supplied the engines for the 1,533-ton screw steamer USS Lackawanna, and for two of the 1,173-ton Sassacus class double-ended sidewheel gunboats, USS Mackinaw and USS Mattabesett. In 1864, the Allaire Works supplied two 100-inch (2,500 mm) cylinder, 4-foot stroke vibrating-lever engines for the 4,912-ton monitor USS Puritan; however delays in supply of the ship's 20-inch (510 mm) Dahlgren smoothbore cannon prevented the vessel from seeing wartime service.

The Allaire Works also supplied the engines in 1864 for the 4,215-ton Wampanoag class screw sloop USS Madawaska. Intended to be a very fast ship, Madawaska was fitted with experimental vibrating-lever engines designed by Navy architect John Ericsson. The engines proved a failure, delivering a cruising speed of only 12.73 knots, well under the specified speed of 15 knots, and they were later replaced with a more conventional power plant.

In addition to the engines directly contracted for, the Navy also requisitioned a number of merchant steamships powered by Allaire engines and converted them into warships. Some of these vessels had been built prior to the war, while others were built during the war and requisitioned by the Navy as they entered service.

The largest and most impressive of these ships was the 3,360-ton oceangoing sidewheel steamer Vanderbilt, launched in 1856, and gifted to the U.S. Navy by Cornelius Vanderbilt in 1862. With her 14 knot speed and long operational range, Vanderbilt was an ideal candidate for a pursuit ship, and after being fitted out with a formidable battery of cannon, the newly commissioned USS Vanderbilt was employed in a year-long hunt for the notorious Confederate raider CSS Alabama, but without success. Other Allaire powered ships commissioned by the Navy included Harriet Lane, James Adger, Magnolia, Rhode Island, R. R. Cuyler and Western World, all built before the war, and Fort Jackson and the ferries Clifton and Shokokon, built during the war.

The Allaire Works also continued to produce engines for commercial vessels during the conflict, such as City of New London, built in 1863, and St. John, which was built in 1864 and used as a hospital ship.

== Postwar slump and closure ==
Shortly after the end of hostilities, the U.S. government dumped more than a million tons of unwanted shipping onto the market, driving down prices and depriving the shipbuilding industry of new orders. The slump lasted several years, and many ship and marine engine builders were driven to bankruptcy in this period.

By 1867, the Allaire Iron Works had only one engine and one boiler on its books. The company soldiered on until 1869 when Cornelius Vanderbilt sold its plant and equipment at auction, which were bought by John Roach at scrap metal prices. Vanderbilt was wealthy enough to survive the slump, but had apparently decided to move his assets into railroads by this time. After the auction, the property of the Allaire Works was divided into a tombstone factory and horse stables.

Roach, one of the few marine entrepreneurs to survive and prosper in the postwar period, took the best of the Allaire Works tools, along with its best former workers, and employed them at his newly acquired plant on the East River, the Morgan Iron Works.

== Production, 1816-1867 ==
=== Merchant ships ===
The following table lists merchant ships with engines supplied by the Allaire Iron Works from the company's inception in 1816 until its closure in 1867. Names in small print preceded or followed by an arrow in the "Name" column indicate that the engine either originated from or was later installed in the ship so named. This is an incomplete list.

Merchant ships powered by Allaire Iron Works engines, 1816-1867
Ship						Engine				Ship notes/references
Name	Type	Built	Builder	Ton.	Intended service (Note: The service for which the vessel was built. Where this is not known, the vessel's original home port, where known, is substituted in parentheses.)	No.	Cyl.; (ins)	Str.; (ft)	Type	Ship notes/references
Chancellor Livingstone	Steamboat	1816	Henry Eckford	495	Hudson River	1	44	5	C	
Sophia		1817	A. S. Roberts	50	Great Lakes					
Savannah	Steamship	1818	Fickett & Crockett	320	Transatlantic	1	40	5	I/DA	Auxiliary steamer; first steamship to make a transatlantic crossing (albeit mostly under sail). Wrecked on Long Island, 1821.
Robert Fulton	Steamship	1819	Henry Eckford	702	Atlantic coast	1	44	5	C	
United States	Steamboat	1821	J. Williams	180	Hudson River	1	44	5	C	
James Kent	Steamboat	1823	Blossom, Smith & Dimon	364	Hudson River	1	44	5	C	
Martha Ogden	Steamboat	1823	A. S. Roberts		Great Lakes	1			C	
Augusta		1824	Brown & Bell	206	Charleston, SC 38					
Henry Eckford	Steamboat	1824	Lawrence & Sneden	150	Hudson River	1	12, 24	4	Cm/C	World's first steam vessel powered by a compound engine.
Linnaeus		1824	Elijah Peck	92	Long Island Sound	1			C	
Oliver Ellsworth		1824	Isaac Webb	227	Long Island Sound	1			C	
Post Boy		1824		258	(New York City)	1		6	Cm/B	
Pilot Boy		1824							Cm	
Thistle		1824		202						
Chief Justice Marshall	Steamboat	1825	Thorne & Williams	314	Hudson River	1			C	
Commerce; Ontario ^{56}	Steamboat	1825	Christian Bergh	371	Hudson River	1	16, 30	4	Cm	
Fanny	Steamboat	1825	Lawrence & Sneden	126	Long Island Sound	1			C	
Swift Sure	Steamboat	1825	Christian Bergh	265	Hudson River	1	16, 30	4	Cm	
Sun	Steamboat	1825			Hudson River	1	16, 30	4	Cm	
Swan		1826	James P. Allaire	353						
Benjamin Franklin	Steamboat	1828	Brown & Bell	410	Long Island Sound	2			VB	
Rufus W. King		1828	Smith & Dimon		New York Harbor	1	34	4	C	
Transport		1828		73	(New York)					
President		1829	Brown & Bell	518	Long Island Sound	2	48	7	VB	
John Stoney		1830	Brown & Bell	163						
Napoleon		1830	Lawrence & Sneden (Note: Built by Lawrence & Sneden according to official records, but by Smith & Dimon according to the Allaire diary.)	136	New York-New Brunswick	1	51	6	C	Lengthened 26 ft (7.9 m). and tonnage increased to 169 tons, 1836. Out of documentation, 1855.
Boston		1831	Brown & Bell	380	Long Island Sound	2	40	7	VB	
John Cooley		1831	P. & T. Peck	35	Atlantic Coast?					
Superior	Steamboat	1831	Smith, Dimon & Comstock	194	Long Island Sound	1	36	8	C	Made 651 trips between New York and New Haven without a breakdown. Engine removed and converted to canal boat, 1859.
Water Witch		1831	Brown & Bell	207	Long Island Sound	1	36	8	C	
William Seabrook		1831	Lawrence & Sneden	227	Atlantic Coast 38					
David Brown	Steamboat	1832		190	Atlantic coast	1			C	
Flushing		1832	Lawrence & Sneden	107	New York–Norwich, CT	1			C	
Splendid	Steamboat	1832	Smith, Dimon & Comstock	209	New Haven	1	37	7	C	
Daniel Webster		1833	John Carrick	358	Great Lakes	1			C	
William Gibbons	Steamboat	1833	Samuel Sneden	294	Atlantic coast	1			C	
Bangor; Sudaver		1834	Brown & Bell	385	Boston–Bangor	1	36	9	C	
Fox		1834		66	New York City–Long Island	1			C	
Sandusky		1834	F. Church	377	Lake Erie 38					
Stonington		1834		211	Rhode Island 38					
Thomas Jefferson		1834	S. Jenkins	428	Great Lakes	1	50	9	C	
Columbia		1835		423	Atlantic coast	1	56	6	C	
Frank	Steamboat	1835	Lawrence & Sneden	175	Hudson River	1	30	6	C	Abandoned 1861.
New Haven	Steamboat	1835	Lawrence & Sneden	342	New Haven	1	47	10	B	
Pioneer		1835			Georgia					
Portland		1835	Nathan Dyer	445	Atlantic Coast	1	56	6	C	
Cincinnati		1836	James Poyas	211	Florida 38					
Home	Steamboat	1836			Atlantic coast	1	56	9	C	
Massachusetts	Steamboat	1836	Brown & Bell	676	Long Island Sound	2	44	9	VB	
New York	Steamboat	1836	Lawrence & Sneden	524	Long Island Sound	1	52	10	C	
Ochmulgee		1836	W. Kirkwood	231	Georgia 38					
Pioneer		1836			Georgia 38					
Rhode Island	Steamboat	1836	Brown & Bell	588	New York–Providence, RI	1	50	11	C	
Clifton		1837	Vanderbilt	162	Atlantic Coast 38					
Illinois	Steamboat	1837	William H. Brown	349	Hudson River	1			C	
Isis	Steamboat	1837		130	Georgia 38					
Mud-machine		1837	[Charleston, SC] 38	60	William Bird					
Despatch		1838	James Poyas	53	Florida 38					
Gov. Dudley		1838	Bishop & Simpson	408	Atlantic Coast 38					
Illinois		1838	B. S. Goodell	755	Great Lakes	1	56	10		
Neptune	Steamboat	1838	Lawrence & Sneden	745	Atlantic Coast	1	50	11 1/2		
Osiris	Steamboat	1838	Bishop & Simonson	145	New York–Red Bank	1			C	
USS General Taylor		1840?		150		1	25.3	6	C	
Iolas; Gipsey ^{66}		1842	Bishop & Simonson	180	New York-Red Bank	2			VB	
Lady Of The Lake; Queen City ^{53}		1842	George S. Weeks	425	Great Lakes	1			C	Fast vessel and first steamboat on Lake Ontario with upper cabin. Destroyed by fire, 1855.
Massachusetts; John W. D. Pentz ^{63}; Massachusetts ^{69}	Steamboat	1842	Lawrence & Sneden	308	Long Island Sound	1			C	
Hero	Steamboat	1844	Lawrence & Sneden	~500	Hudson River	1			C	
Hendrik Hudson	Steamboat	1845	George Collyer	1170	Hudson River	1	72	11		
Traveller; Traveler ^{54}		1845	Bishop & Simonson?	584	Long Island Sound	1	52	11	VB	
Bay State	Steamboat	1846	Lawrence & Sneden	1600	Long Island Sound	1	76	12	B	
Cricket; L. Boardman ^{57}; River Belle ^{80}	Steamboat	1846	William H. Brown	204	Hudson River	1	36	10	VB	Converted to tugboat 1866; rebuilt for passenger/freight service 1880; sank 1894.
Isaac Newton	Steamboat	1846	William Brown	1332	Hudson River	1	81	12	B	
C. Vanderbilt	Steamboat	1847	Bishop & Simonson		Long Island Sound	1	72	12	B	
Commodore	Steamboat	1848	Bishop & Simonson	984	Long Island Sound	1	65	11	VB	
Panama	Steamship	1848	William H. Webb	1087	Intercoastal	1	70	8.7	SL	
Plymouth Rock ^{y}; Empire State	Steamboat	1848	Samuel Sneden	1598	Long Island Sound	1	76	12	VB	
State of Maine; San Pelayo ^{71}	Steamboat	1848	Bishop & Simonson	806	Maine coast	1	54	11	VB	
Canonicus	Steamboat	1849	Lawrence & Sneden	396	Long Island Sound	1	36	12	VB	
Pacific	Steamship	1849	Brown & Bell		Transatlantic	2	95	9	SL	
America		185?								
Niagara		185?								
Baltic	Steamship	1850	Brown & Bell		Transatlantic	2	96	10	SL	
Buckeye State		1850		1187	Great Lakes	1	37, 80	11	AC	
Director		1850	J. Simonson	65	Lake Nicaragua	1			C	Built for Cornelius Vanderbilt's Nicaragua Line. She was the first steamship to sail on Lake Nicaragua.
Daniel Webster	Steamboat	1851	William H. Brown	1035	New York-Nicaragua	1	56	10	VB	
Illinois		1851	Smith & Dimon	2040	South America	2	85	9	O	
Northern Light	Steamship	1851	J. Simonson	1768	New York-Nicaragua	2	60	10	VB	
Union		1851			South America	2	60	7	SL	
Black Warrior	Steamship	1852	W. Collyer	1350	Atlantic coast	1	65	11	VB	
San Juan; Star Of The West ^{52}; CSS St. Philip ^{62}	Steamship	1852	J. Simonson	1172	New York-Nicaragua	2	66	11	VB	USQMD 1861, captured by Confederacy 1861 and converted to receiving and training ship, later sunk as obstruction in Yazoo River.
California	Steamboat	1852	Samuel Sneden	480	Gulf of Mexico	1	40	10	VB	
James Adger	Steamship	1852	William H. Webb	1152d	Atlantic coast	1			SL	
Uncle Sam	Steamship	1852	Perine, Patterson & Stack	1800	Atlantic Coast	1	66	11	B	
North Star	Steamship	1853	J. Simonson	2000	Atlantic coast	2	66	10	VB	(Note: Note that this source gives the cylinder width as 60 inches (1,500 mm) rather than 66.)
St. Lawrence		1853	F. N. Jones	1844	Great Lakes	1	81	12	VB	
Yankee Blade	Steamship	1853	Perrine, Patterson & Stack	1767	New York-Panama	1	76	12	SL	
Cahawba		1854	W. Collyer	1643	Atlantic coast	1	75	11	VB	
Magnolia		1854	J. Simonson	1500	California	1	75	11	VB	
Mercury		1854	W. Collyer		N.Y. Harbor	1				
Plymouth Rock; →Plymouth Rock 64		1854	J. Englis	2202	Great Lakes	1	81	12	VB	
Plymouth Rock		1854	J. Simonson	1752	Long Island	1	76	12	VB	
Western World; →Fire Queen 64		1854	J. Englis	2202	Great Lakes	1	81	12	VB	
Ariel	Steamship	1855	J. Simonson	1850	Atlantic coast	1	75	11	VB	
Granada		1855	J. Simonson	1059	Atlantic coast	1	65	10	VB	
Leviathan	Tugboat	1855	Eckford Webb	500	New York Harbor	1	60	10	VB	
Vanderbilt	Steamship	1856	J. Simonson		Transatlantic	2	90	12	VB	
William H. Webb		1856	William H. Webb		N.Y. Harbor?	2	44	10	B	
USRC Harriet Lane	Rev cutter	1857	William H. Webb	674d	U.S. Coast Guard	2?			I	
Champion		1859	Harlan & Hollingsworth	1490	Pacific Ocean	1	42	10	VB	
Commodore Perry*	Ferry	1859	Thomas Stack	513	New York Harbor	1	38	9	VB	
John Brooks	Steamboat	1859	John Englis	900	Bridgeport	1	56	12	VB	
Seth Grosvenor		1859	Henry Steers	84	Liberia	1	28	3	St	
Rhode Island		1860	J. Westerwelt	2000	Charleston	1	72 1/2	12	B	
R. R. Cuyler	Steamship	1860	Samuel Sneden	1200d	New York-Havana	1	70	4	VDA/G	
Yankee	Steamship	1860	T. Collyer	376	New York Harbor	1	38	8 2/3	C	
USS Clifton		1861	J. Simonson	977	Staten Island	1	50	10	VB	
Kings County		1861	Roosevelt & Joyce	500	New York-Long Island	1	34	9	B	
Suffolk County		1861	Roosevelt & Joyce	500	New York-Long Island	1	34	9	B	
Thomas Freeborn	Tugboat	1861	Lawrence & Foulks	306	Atlantic coast	1	40	8	VB	
City of Norwich		1862	John Englis	890	New Haven	1	52	10	VB	
Eagle		1862	J. Westervelt	1561	New York–Havana	1	75	12	VB	
USS Fort Jackson	Steamship	1862	J. Simonson	1850		1			VB	
USS Shokokon	Ferry	1862	J. Simonson	709d	Staten Island	1	36	8	VB	(Note: The original Clifton and Westfield were purchased by the government and served as USS Clifton and USS Westfield. The replacement vessels for these original ferryboats were also named Clifton and Westfield. The second Clifton was also purchased by the Navy however, and served as USS Shokokon. The second Westfield appears to have been employed in its original role as a Staten Island ferry.)
Westfield	Ferry	1862	J. Simonson	960	Staten Island	1	36	8	VB	
City of New London		1863	J. Englis & Son	696	New Haven	1	52	10	B	Rebuilt in 1865 and 1866; tonnage increased to 1,203. (Note: The source gives the dimensions of this engine as 54 inch cylinder and 11 inches (280 mm) stroke.)
Commodore; Costa Rica; Genaki Maru		1863	J. Simonson			1	80	12	B	
Evening Star		1863			New York-Havana	1	81	12	B	
Hu Quang		1863	Henry Steers	1570	China	1	76	12	VB	
Katahdin	Steamboat	1863	J. Englis & Son	1234	Long Island Sound	1	56	11	VB	
Kin Kiang		1863	J. Englis & Son	1025	China	1	58	12	VB	(Note: The name of this vessel is sometimes rendered Kiu Kiang.)
Morning Star		1863	Roosevelt & Joyce		New York-Havana	1	81	12	B	(Note: The source gives the cylinder diameter as 18 inches (460 mm) - this is a typographical error, it should be 81 inches (2,100 mm).)
Po Yang		1863	Roosevelt, Joyce	956	China	1	50	12	VB	
←Western World; Fire Queen; Kiangwae ^{77}		1864	John Englis	3801	China	1	81	12	VB	
Moro Castle		1864	J. A. Westervelt	1987	New York-Havana	1	76	12	VB	
New York		1864	J. Simonson	3200		1	90	12	B	
←Plymouth Rock 54; Plymouth Rock; Foong Shuey ^{64}; Plymouth Rock ^{64}; Kiangyuen ^{77}		1864	Westervelt & Bro.	2379	China	1	81	12	VB	
St. John	Steamboat	1864			Hudson River	1	85	15		
Dean Richmond	Steamboat	1865	J. Englis & Son	2525	Hudson River	1	75	14	VB	(Note: The engine for this ship was originally manufactured by the Phoenix Foundry for Francis Skiddy. The Allaire Works rebuilt the engine for its installation into Dean Richmond. Ryder (1966).)
Favorita		1865	J. Westervelt & Son	865	Pacific	1	56		VB	
Niagara		1865	Westervelt & Son	1100	New York-Richmond	1	60	11	VB	
Old Colony		1865	John Englis & Son		New York–Fall River, MA	1	80	12	VB	(Note: The engine for this vessel was actually that originally fitted to Bay State (1846), salvaged after the latter was scrapped, and rebored to a diameter of 80 inches (2,000 mm).)
Orient		1865				1	68	11	B	
Rising Star	Steamship	1865	Roosevelt, Joyce & Waterbury	1915		1			VB	
Saratoga		1865	Westervelt & Son	1100	New York-Richmond	1	60	11	VB	
Drew	Steamboat	1866	John Englis	2902	Hudson River	1	81	14	VB	
Oregonian	Steamship	1866	Lawrence & Foulks	2200	California coast	1	82	12	VB	

Legend: Built=year built; Ton.=gross tonnage; Deployment=original location of operation. Where the original deployment is not known, the location is followed by a number, which represents the last two digits of the year in which the vessel is known to have operated at the given location; No.=number of engines; Cyl.=diameter of engine cylinder(s) in inches; Str.=engine stroke in feet; Type=engine type. Types of engine include: AC=annular compound; B=beam; C=compound; CB=compound beam; C=crosshead. Crosshead engines built by this company are almost certainly all of the American "square" type, rather than the Steeple type; DA=direct-acting; DS=double screw; GS=geared screw; HBA=horizontal back-acting; I=inclined; O=oscillating; S=screw; St=steeple; SL=side-lever; V=vertical; VB=vertical beam; VL=vibrating-lever.

=== Warships ===
The following table lists warships powered by Allaire Iron Works engines. This list is confined to vessels that were designed and built as warships, and does not include merchant ships commissioned into the Navy.

Warships powered by Allaire Iron Works engines (1861–65)
Ship					Engine			
Name	Type	Built	Builder	Disp.	No.	Cyl. (ins)	Str. (ft)	Type
USS Penobscot	G	1861	C. P. Carter	691	2	30	1 1/2	HBA/S
USS Winona	G	1861	C. & R. Poillon	691	2	30	1 1/2	HBA/S
USS Lackawanna	SS	1862	New York Navy Yard	2,526	2	42	2 1/2	HBA/S
USS Mackinaw	DEG	1863	New York Navy Yard	1,173	1	58	8 3/4	I/DA
USS Mattabesett	DEG	1863	New York Navy Yard	1,173	1	58	8 3/4	I/DA
USS Puritan	M	1864	Continental Iron Works	4,192	2	100	4	VL/DS
USS Madawaska	SF	1865	New York Navy Yard	4,105	2	100	4	VL/S

Legend: Type=ship type. Types include - G=gunboat; SS=screw sloop; DEG=double-ended gunboat; M=monitor; SF=screw frigate. Built=Year of ship launch, or completion where launch date is unknown; Builder=Name of ship builder; Disp.=displacement in tons; No.=number of engines; Cyl.=diameter of engine cylinder(s) in inches; Str.=engine stroke in feet; Type=engine type. Types of engine include: DA=direct acting; DS=double screw; HBA=horizontal back-acting; I=inverted; S=screw; VL=vibrating-lever. See marine steam engine for explanation of various engine types.

== See also ==
- Marine steam engine
