= Thomas Powell (steamboat) =

Former Hudson River steamboat in New York, US

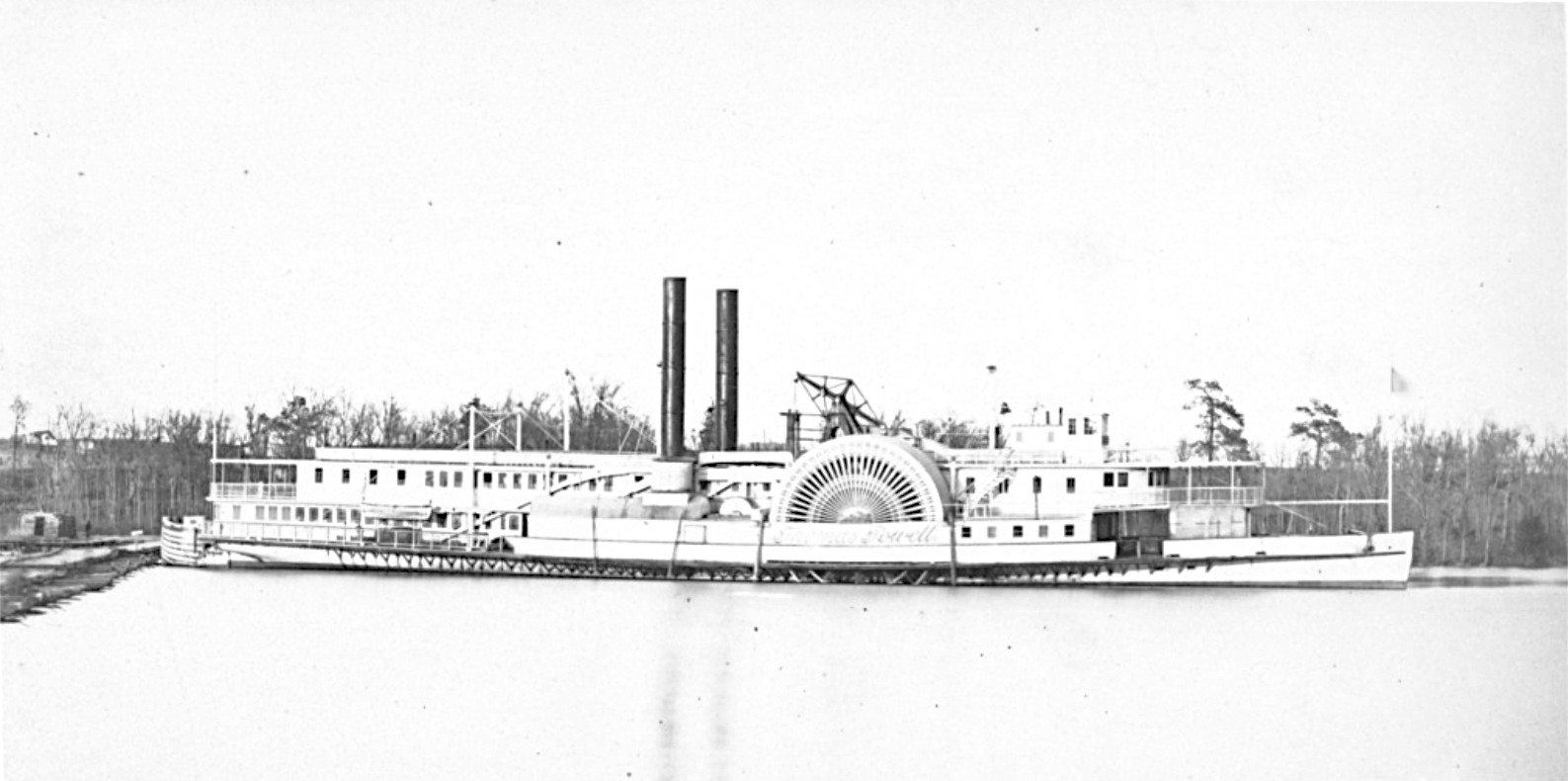
- Thomas Powell in the Appomattox River, Virginia, during or shortly after her American Civil War service, 1865

History
- Name: Thomas Powell
- Owner: Thomas Powell et al (1846–49); New York & Erie Railroad (1849–51); Newcastle and Frenchtown T & RR Co. (1851–55); Oscar Hoyt (1855); Absalom L. Anderson (1855–1862); Catskill Steam Transportation Co. (1862–69); Joseph Cornell et al (1869–71); Citizens Steamboat Company of Troy (1872–81)
- Operator: See owners
- Builder: Lawrence & Sneden (Manhattan, NY)
- Completed: 1846
- Maiden voyage: 30 Apr 1846
- In service: 1846–1879
- Fate: Scrapped at Port Ewen, New York, 1881

General characteristics
- Type: Sidewheel steamboat
- Tonnage: 585
- Length: Original: 231 ft 2 in (70.46 m); 1865: 225 ft 9 in (68.81 m); 1872: 260 ft 9 in (79.48 m)
- Beam: 28 ft 11 in (8.81 m)
- Propulsion: Vertical beam: 48-in bore × 11-ft stroke

Thomas Powell was a fast and popular steamboat built in Manhattan, New York City in 1846 for service on the Hudson River. She ran between New York City and various Hudson River destinations during her career, including Newburgh, Piermont, Poughkeepsie, Rondout, Catskill, and finally as a nightboat to Troy. She also ran on the Delaware River for some years in the 1850s, and during the American Civil War served as a Union Army dispatch boat.

Thomas Powell was considered one of the fastest, if not the fastest, of the Hudson River steamers of her time, capable of speeds in excess of 22 miles per hour (35 km/h). Her speed, excellent accommodations and good management made her a favorite with the traveling public, and consequently, she retained her original name to the end of her career. Her last known trip was made in 1879 and she was scrapped in 1881.

== Construction and design ==
In 1846, Thomas Powell, a prominent businessman of Newburgh, New York, and his son-in-law Homer Ramsdell, ordered a new steamboat to replace Powell's Highlander, which had been running on the New York–to–Newburgh route since 1836. The new steamboat was named Thomas Powell after her part-owner.

Thomas Powell, a wooden-hulled sidewheel steamer, was built by Lawrence & Sneden of Manhattan, New York, under the supervision of her future captain, Samuel Johnson. She was 231 feet 2 inches (70.46 m) long, with a beam of 28 feet 11 inches (8.81 m), draft of 5 feet 6 inches (1.68 m) and hold depth of 9 feet (2.7 m) Her registered tonnage was 585. A bust of her namesake was mounted on the pilot house roof.

Thomas Powell was powered by a single-cylinder vertical beam engine with bore of 48 inches (120 cm), stroke of 11 feet (3.4 m), and steam cut-off set at 8 feet (2.4 m). Steam was supplied by two boilers, one on each guard in accordance with the prevailing fashion, at a working pressure of 50 psi (340 kPa), and fuel consumption was two tons of anthracite coal per hour. Both the engine and boilers were built by T. F. Secor & Co. of New York. The water wheels had a diameter of 29 feet 6 inches (8.99 m) and a paddle length of 9 feet (2.7 m).

== Service history ==
=== Newburgh service 1846–1848 ===
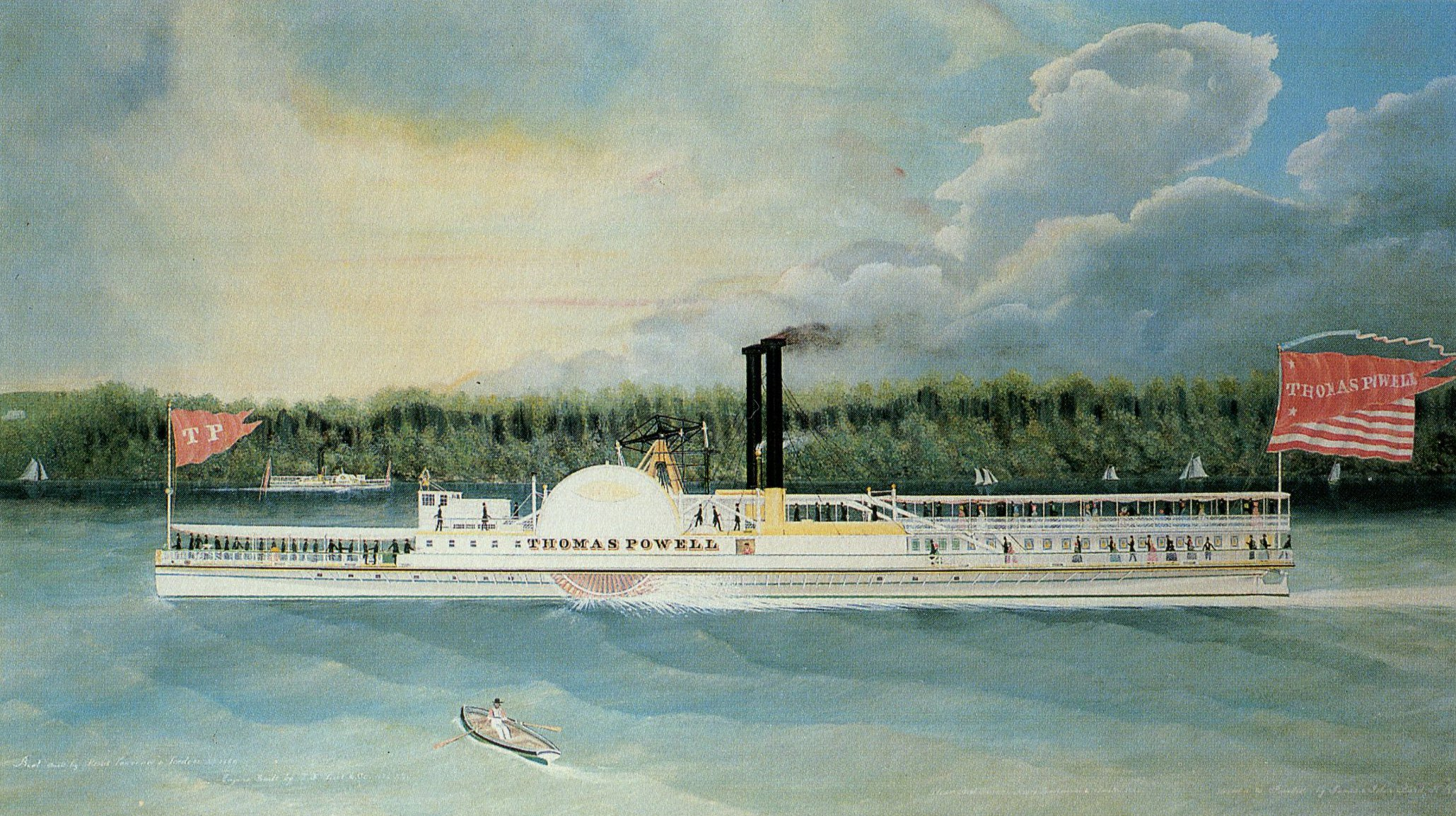
1846 oil painting of Thomas Powell by James Bard. Compare the solid paddle boxes in this image with the latticed design (see photo above) later adopted.

Thomas Powell made her maiden voyage from New York to Newburgh on 30 April 1846. She thereafter maintained a regular schedule, departing from Warren Street, New York, for Newburgh at 4 pm Monday through Saturday, with intermediate stops at Van Courtland's Dock, Peekskill, West Point, Cold Spring and Cornwall. Return trips from Newburgh departed at 6:30 am Monday and 7 am Tuesday through Saturday. The steamer did not operate on Sundays.

Thomas Powell's excellent passenger accommodations, exceptional speed and good management quickly made her a favorite with the traveling public. On 18 June, she went from New York to Cauldwell's—a 43-mile (69 km) distance—in just 2 hours, reaching Newburgh 40 minutes later, the average speed over the total distance being 22.5 miles per hour (36.2 km/h). On 16 August, the steamer went from New York to Newburgh, a distance of 60 miles (97 km)—including five intermediate stops totalling 20 minutes—in 3 hours 6 minutes, (Note: Heyl erroneously gives the time as 4 hours and 6 minutes.) at an average speed of just under 22 miles per hour (35 km/h), reinforcing her reputation as one of the fastest boats on the Hudson.

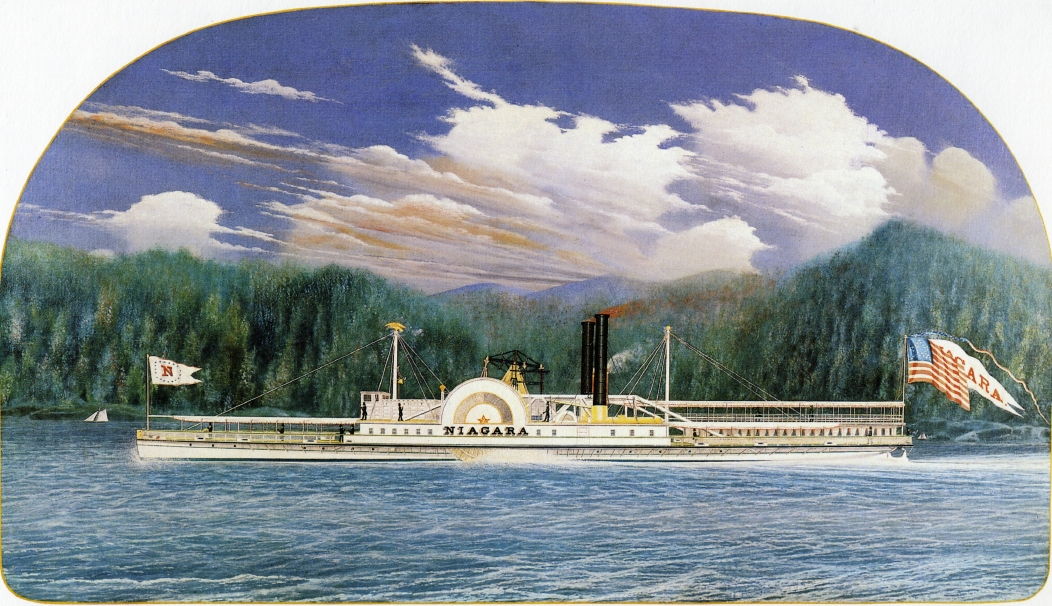
The steamboat Niagara

One boat considered a possible rival to Thomas Powell in terms of speed at this time was Mountaineer, a steamer of about the same size and tonnage that had entered service the same year. In July, Mountaineer had easily beaten Thomas Powell's predecessor Highlander, and opinion was divided as to which of the two newer boats was faster. On 13 August, Mountaineer departed Hammond Street, New York, some minutes earlier than usual, and thus came within sight of Thomas Powell as the two boats made their way to Peekskill. Approaching Yonkers, Mountaineer was about two miles behind Thomas Powell, but reportedly put on "a great head of steam" and appeared to be catching her rival when a loud explosion occurred and she was enveloped in a cloud of steam. Thomas Powell's captain immediately put his vessel about to go to the aid of the stricken steamer, which had blown a sheet from her steam chimney. Several passengers and crew who were scalded in the accident were taken aboard Thomas Powell, along with the other passengers, for the completion of their passages.

Thomas Powell continued to operate between New York and Newburgh in the 1847 season, her owners renting a berth at Warren Street for the sum of $2,000 annually. On June 8, the steamer reportedly completed the journey from New York to Newburgh in 3 hours flat, with a total running time of 2 hours 35 minutes, at an average of 23.26 miles per hour (37.43 km/h)—a speed said by a contemporaneous journal to be obtainable by "few boats, and very few railroads" in the country at the time.

The following month, the steamboat Niagara was on her way from New York to Albany when a steam component gave way about 25 miles (40 km) north of the city, causing an explosion that reportedly killed two of the boat's engineers and scalded several passengers. The steamboats Roger Williams and Thomas Powell were quickly on the scene, the former taking most of the passengers aboard, including some with milder injuries, for completion of their journey to Albany. Thomas Powell in the meantime towed the stricken Niagara to shore, before taking two more seriously injured passengers aboard in order to return them to New York City for medical treatment.

=== Piermont and Poughkeepsie service, 1849–1850 ===
By early 1849, the New York and Erie Railroad had completed its line between Port Jervis and Piermont, New York, creating a demand for a more frequent steamboat service between Piermont and New York City. Thomas Powell & Co., which had a financial interest in the railroad, consequently decided to sell Thomas Powell to the line to help meet this demand, with the steamboat Roger Williams taking the Powell's place on the Newburgh route. Thomas Powell was subsequently placed on a schedule of two round trips per day between the city and Piermont, leaving the former at 7 am and 4 pm daily. The steamboat Erie (formerly Iron Witch) was also acquired by the railroad for the service. Passenger baggage was placed in barges towed by the steamers.

Thomas Powell continued in this service for two seasons. By 1851, passenger travel on the river had declined due to the completion of the Hudson River Railroad to Albany, and on May 12 of that year, the steamer was sold to Thomas Hulse, who placed her on a route between New York City and Poughkeepsie. She remained in this service for only a few weeks however before being sold to the Newcastle and Frenchtown Turnpike & Railroad Company for service on the Delaware River.

=== Philadelphia to Cape May service, 1851–1856 ===
After acquiring Thomas Powell, the Newcastle and Frenchtown Turnpike & Railroad Company placed the steamer, along with the steamboat General McDonald, on the 105-mile (169 km) route between Philadelphia and Cape May, New Jersey, on the Delaware Bay, in opposition to the old steamboats Ohio and Morris. In addition to her regular trips on this route, Thomas Powell was also employed occasionally during this period as an excursion steamer.

The steamer continued in this service until September 1855, when she was sold to parties in New York.

=== Saugerties, Poughkeepsie, Rondout and Catskill service, 1856–1863 ===
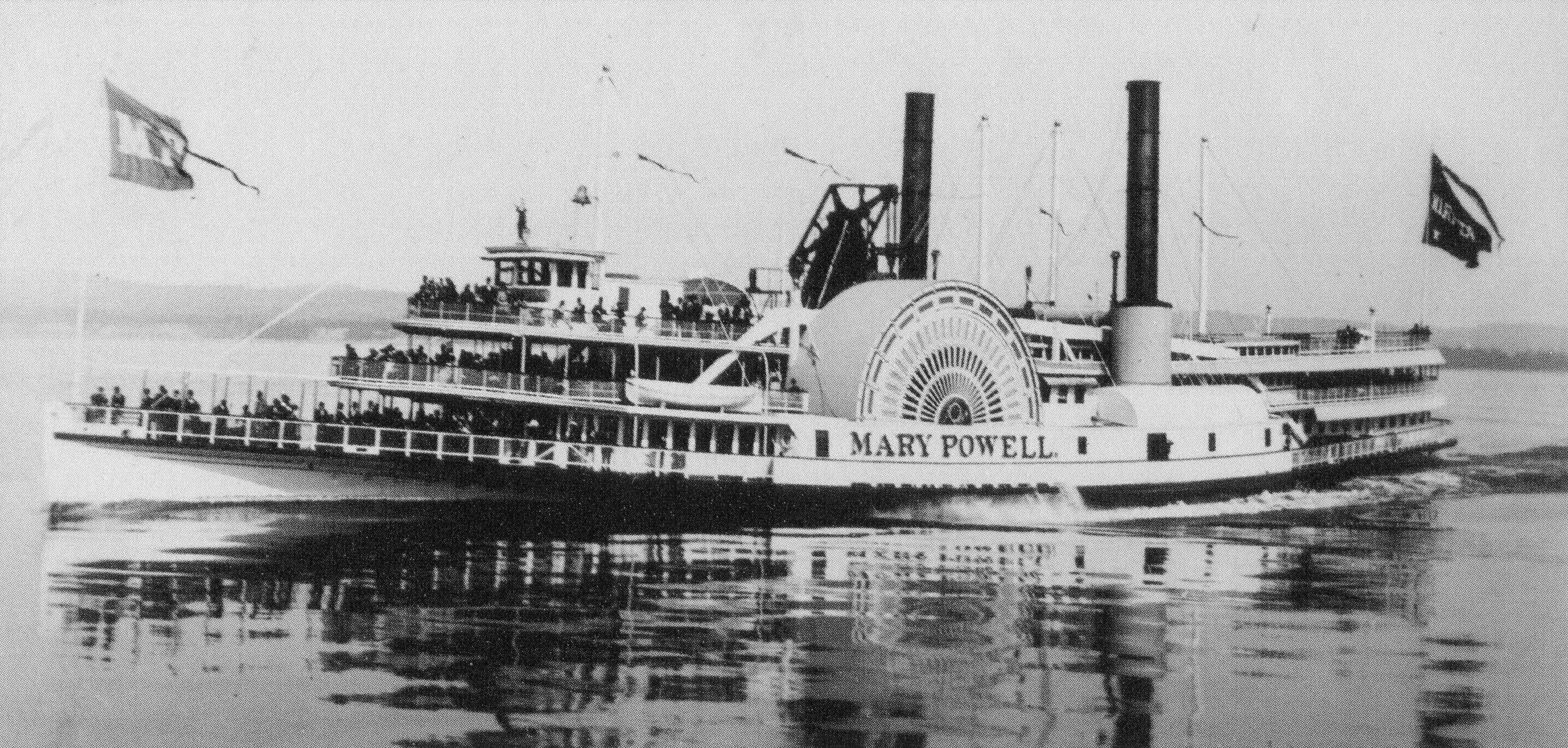
Mary Powell (pictured), Thomas Powell's replacement on the Rondout route, retained the Powell name to capitalize on the high reputation of her predecessor

By late 1855, Thomas Powell had come into the possession of Oscar Hoyt of New York, who returned her to service on the Hudson River, running between New York City and Albany. Though the steamer would remain in Hudson River service for the rest of her commercial career, she only briefly continued on the Albany route before being purchased in the winter of 1855 by Captain Absalom L. Anderson.

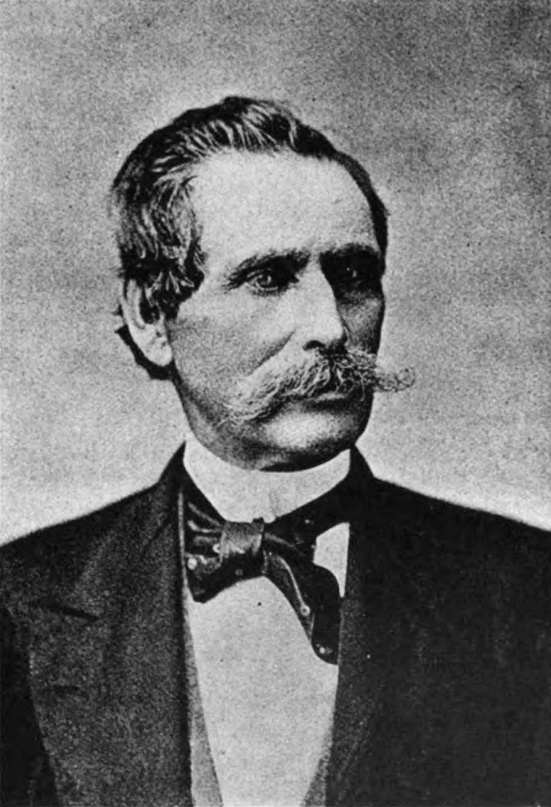
Captain A. L. Anderson

Anderson originally used Thomas Powell to replace the aging steamer Robert L. Stevens, which he had been running on a route between New York City and his hometown of Saugerties. After only one season, however, he realized that the Powell was too large for the service, and in 1857 he switched her destination to Poughkeepsie. Thomas Powell remained on the Poughkeepsie route until 1858, when the citizens of Rondout, who had been deprived of a steamboat service since the withdrawal of the Alida in 1855, persuaded Anderson to extend his steamboat service the additional 16 miles (26 km) to their city. The initial run by the steamer to Rondout was made from Jay Street, New York, at 3:53 pm on April 24, 1858. Thomas Powell's regularly scheduled service began two days later on the 26th, the vessel departing Rondout at 5:30 am Monday through Saturday, arriving at Jay Street at 11 am after the 90-mile (140 km) run, and leaving again for Rondout at 3:45 pm. (Note: Heyl erroneously states that the steamer's destination at this time was Newburgh rather than Rondout.) The route thus established would be maintained, largely by Anderson and his sons, for the next sixty years (albeit with several different vessels).

In 1860, the new steamboat Daniel Drew appeared on the river, and Anderson realized that Thomas Powell, previously among the fastest and best-appointed steamboats afloat, was on the verge of being outclassed by a new generation of vessels. He decided to order a new steamboat to replace the Powell, but was unable to do so for another year due to other financial commitments, and his new steamboat, Mary Powell—retaining the Powell name to capitalize on the high reputation of her predecessor—was not launched until August 1861.

Mary Powell's contract stipulated that she was to be faster by "one mile in twelve" than Thomas Powell or the builder was reportedly to forfeit $5,000—considered a bad bet by pundits given the latter's reputation for speed. Although she was not quite completed, Anderson attempted to rush Mary Powell into service, and she made her first voyage to Rondout on 12 October, but shortly after was replaced by her predecessor and would not run again until the following year. Mary Powell's initial speed reached only 21.6 miles per hour (34.8 km/h), seeming to prove the skeptics correct, but the following year she was declared by her owner to be a faster boat on the Rondout run by an average of 30 minutes.

Following the end of the 1861 season, Thomas Powell was sold to the Catskill Steam Transportation Company for the sum of $35,000 (equivalent to $1,254,167 in 2025) and in 1862, made her debut on the New York City to Catskill route. She would continue on this route until 1864.

=== American Civil War service, 1864 ===
On April 12, 1864, Thomas Powell was chartered at the rate of $300 (equivalent to $6,176 in 2025) per day by the United States Quartermaster Department for service in the American Civil War. She subsequently served as Major-General Benjamin Butler's dispatch boat, and participated in the Bermuda Hundred campaign. The steamer's charter expired on June 9, 1864.

=== Catskill and Troy service, 1864–1877 ===
After the expiration of her USQMD charter, Thomas Powell returned to service with the Catskill Steam Transportation Company and resumed operation on the Catskill route, which she continued until 1872. That year, she was thoroughly overhauled and rebuilt, with her length increased by 29 feet 9 inches (9.07 m) and staterooms added, her registered tonnage thus increasing to 735. On June 5, 1872, she was purchased by the newly-formed Citizens Steamboat Company and placed on the route between New York City and Troy, New York, as a nightboat, her stablemate in this service being the steamer Sunnyside. In 1875, Sunnyside was sunk by ice and replaced by the steamer Twilight. Thomas Powell and Twilight continued operating on the Troy route until June 15, 1877, when the new steamer Saratoga replaced Thomas Powell, which in turn was retained as a spare boat. In 1878, Thomas Powell was occasionally employed by the company as an excursion steamer, and in 1879, she briefly returned to the Rondout run to replace the steamboat Thomas Cornell, which was in the process of being rebuilt.

=== Scrapping ===
After being laid up for about two years, Thomas Powell was scrapped in 1881 at Port Ewen, New York, (Note: Heyl erroneously states that the steamer was scrapped in 1887.) "after thirty-five years of splendid service." That she retained her original name to the end of her career was considered a tribute to her enduring high reputation; it was also said of her that no steamboat "of her [cylinder] inches" ever matched her speed. After her scrapping, her ship's bell was donated to the school board of Keyport, New Jersey, and used in the tower of the local high school. Her engine clock was acquired by marine engineer and historian George W. Murdock.
