= HMS Persian (1839) =

History

United Kingdom
- Name: Persian
- Ordered: 31 December 1835
- Builder: Pembroke Dockyard
- Laid down: May 1838
- Launched: 7 October 1839
- Completed: 24 April 1840
- Commissioned: 23 February 1840
- Fate: Broken up by 27 June 1866

General characteristics (as built)
- Class & type: Acorn-class brig-sloop
- Tons burthen: 483 88/94 bm
- Length: 105 ft 1 in (32.0 m) (Gun deck); 82 ft 9 in (25.2 m) (Keel)
- Beam: 33 ft 6 in (10.2 m)
- Draught: 11 ft 9 in (3.6 m)
- Depth: 14 ft 10 in (4.5 m)
- Complement: 110–130
- Armament: 2 × 32-pdr guns; 14 × 32-pdr carronades

HMS Persian was a sixteen-gun Acorn-class brig-sloop built for the Royal Navy during the 1830s.

== Description ==
Persian had a length at the gundeck of 105 feet 1 inch (32.0 m) and 82 feet 9 inches (25.2 m) at the keel. She had a beam of 33 feet 6 inches (10.2 m), a draught of 11 feet 9 inches (3.6 m) and a depth of hold of 14 feet 10 inches (4.5 m). The ship's tonnage was 483 88/94 tons burthen. The Acorn class was initially armed with a pair of 32-pounder guns and fourteen 32-pounder carronades. The armament was later changed to four 32-pounder cannon and a dozen 32-pounder carronades. The ships had a crew of 110–30 officers and ratings.

== Construction and career ==
Persian, the second ship of her name to serve in the Royal Navy, was ordered on 31 December 1835, laid down in May 1838 at Pembroke Dockyard, Wales, and launched on 7 October 1839. She was completed on 28 April 1840 at Plymouth Dockyard and commissioned on 23 February of that year.
