= Morgan Iron Works =

American company manufacturing plant for marine steam engines

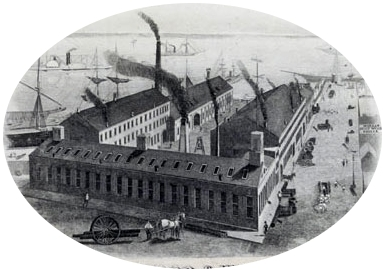
- Type: Private
- Industry: Manufacturing
- Predecessor: T. F. Secor & Co.
- Founded: 1838
- Founders: T. F. Secor; Charles Morgan; William K. Caulkin
- Defunct: 1907
- Fate: Sold
- Headquarters: New York, United States
- Area served: United States
- Key people: T. F. Secor, Charles Morgan, George W. Quintard; later John Roach and his sons John Baker and Stephen Roach
- Products: Marine steam engines
- Services: Ship repair
- Total assets: $450,000 (1867)
- Owner: T. F. Secor, W. K. Caulkin and Charles Morgan (1838-1850); Charles Morgan (1850-1867); John Roach & Sons (1867-1907)
- Number of employees: 1,000 (1865)

The Morgan Iron Works was a 19th-century manufacturing plant for marine steam engines located in New York City, United States. Founded as T. F. Secor & Co. in 1838, the plant was later taken over and renamed by one of its original investors, Charles Morgan.

The Morgan Iron Works remained a leading manufacturer of marine engines throughout the 19th century, producing at least 144 in the period between 1838 and 1867, including 23 for U.S. Navy vessels during the American Civil War.

The Morgan Iron Works was sold to shipbuilder John Roach in 1867, who integrated its operations with his shipyard in Chester, Pennsylvania. The Works continued to operate as both an engine plant and a ship repair facility in the hands of Roach and his son John Baker Roach until 1907, when the Roach family finally retired from the shipbuilding business.

== Secor & Co., 1838–1850 ==
The marine engine works of T. F. Secor and Co. was originally established in New York City, at 9th Street, East River, in 1838. The works was at this time owned by three partners—T. F. Secor, William K. Caulkin and budding transport entrepreneur Charles Morgan, each of whom had one-third ownership of the new firm.

In 1845, the U.S. Congress made a number of legislative changes, including the establishment of subsidies, which were aimed at allowing American shipping lines to compete more effectively with their British counterparts. The new legislation contributed to a growing demand in the United States for steamships, encouraging Morgan to divest himself of the last of his shares in sailing vessels and plough the money instead into the Secor plant, which was expanded to include one and a half blocks between Eight and Tenth Streets. By this time, the plant employed up to 700 men, and was building engines for both coastal and oceangoing steamships.

== Morgan/Quintard ownership, 1850–1867 ==
In 1847, Morgan appointed his son-in-law, George W. Quintard, to the financial department of Secor & Co. Quintard proved a capable manager and rose quickly in the firm. Morgan bought out the other partners in February 1850 and renamed the firm the Morgan Iron Works. Quintard became the plant's new manager, a position he was to retain until the sale of the firm to John Roach in 1867. Morgan, now the plant's sole owner, was the firm's financier, supplying its capital and credit.

The only variation to this arrangement occurred between May 1, 1857 to May 1, 1861, when Morgan's other son-in-law, Charles A. Whitney, joined the firm as co-manager. During this period, Morgan conveyed the Works to the ownership of Quintard and Whitney for the sum of $250,000 (equivalent to $8,638,393 in 2025), giving Whitney a one-third stake in the company and Quintard the remainder. The two manager-owners took out a $67,000 mortgage (equivalent to $2,400,833 in 2025) on the property to raise operating capital. After Whitney left the firm to pursue other business interests, Morgan returned as sole owner, purchasing the business for its sale price of $250,000 as of a few years prior, and settling the mortgage himself.

=== 1850s ===
Following the Morgan takeover in 1850, Quintard embarked on an extensive improvement program for the Works, installing steam hammers, a floating steam derrick and other heavy equipment, as well as building a new dockyard on the East River. Quintard also began diversifying the firm's products, manufacturing machinery for Cuban sugar mills and large pumps for a Chicago water company.

By this time, Morgan himself, whose transportation business was steadily expanding, had become the plant's main customer. In 1850, Morgan ordered the 1,875 ton steamer San Francisco and the 1,359 ton Brother Jonathan, both built for operation with Morgan's Empire City Line. In 1852, he decided to replace some of his older ships, and ordered Texas (1,151 tons), Louisiana (1,056 t), Mexico (1,043 t), Perseverance (827 t) and Meteor (542 t) all of which had engines built by the Morgan Iron Works.

In the same period, Morgan lost to accidents four of his existing ships: Palmetto, Globe, Galveston and the newly built Meteor, with a total value of $250,000. As all four ships had been self-insured in line with Morgan's usual practice, none of the losses were recoverable. Morgan was by this time wealthy enough to be able to absorb the losses however, and in the following two years he had another four vessels built, including Charles Morgan (1,215 tons), Nautilus (898 t), Orizaba (734 t) and Tennessee (1,149 t), all but the last of which also had their engines supplied by the Morgan Works.

The Morgan Iron Works secured its first naval contract on October 28, 1858, for a steam sloop-of-war, the USS Seminole. The contract was met with charges of favoritism from Republicans, and in a subsequent Congressional enquiry, Quintard pointed out that the Works had bid for a number of navy contracts previously but never been successful. The inquiry ultimately rejected the charges.

By the end of the decade, the Morgan Works was one of America's leading manufacturers of marine steam engines, specializing in medium-sized machinery for coastal and river service. From 1850 through 1860, the Works built engines for a total of 49 vessels, and its engines were in use with American steamship companies from the United States to as far afield as China.

=== American Civil War, 1861–65 ===
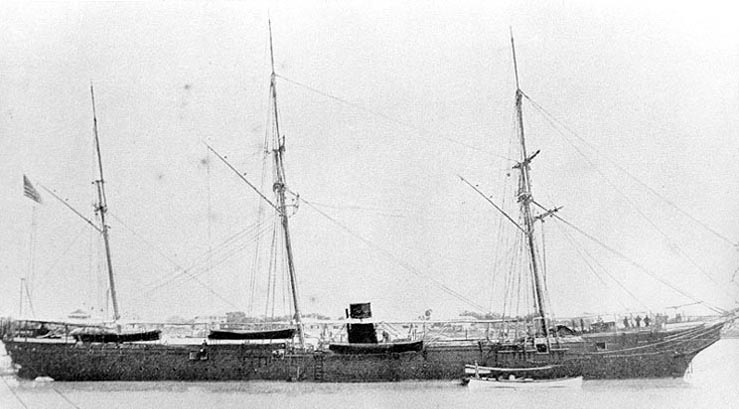
Steam sloop-of-war USS Wachusett

The American Civil War began disastrously for Charles Morgan when the Confederacy seized his entire Gulf of Mexico fleet. In spite of this blow however, Morgan was to recover and profit handsomely from the war, mainly through the agency of the Morgan Iron Works.

The war created great demand for new shipping, and shipyards and engine manufacturers alike experienced an unprecedented boom. Like many other builders of marine engines, the Morgan Iron Works was to take full advantage of this demand, building engines for 38 vessels during the war, including 23 merchantmen and 13 warships for the U.S. Navy. The plant even found time to turn out an engine for an Italian Navy warship in this period, the Re Don Luige de Portogallo. U.S. Navy warships fitted with Morgan Iron Works engines included USS Ticonderoga, USS Ascutney, USS Wachusett and the experimental high-speed warship USS Ammonoosuc. The Works also contracted for the complete construction of the monitor USS Onondaga, although the hull was subcontracted out to another firm.

By the end of the war, the Morgan Works had grossed $2,275,991.10 (equivalent to $47,870,030 in 2025) from its naval contracts alone. Morgan himself made further profits during the war by ordering ships from Harlan & Hollingsworth, which he then sold or chartered to the U.S. Navy.

=== Sale to John Roach, 1867 ===
After the war, the U.S. government auctioned off at firesale prices the hundreds of ships it had requisitioned during the conflict, depressing the market and leaving U.S. shipyards and marine engine builders with little or no work. As a consequence, most of the marine engine manufacturing companies of New York went out of business in the years immediately following the war. Two notable exceptions were the Morgan Iron Works, and the Etna Iron Works of John Roach.

Unlike his competitors, John Roach had been able to maintain his profits in the postwar period by diversifying his plant into the manufacture of machine tools and selling them to the U.S. Navy, which was in the process of upgrading its shipyards. By contrast, the Morgan Iron Works, like most other New York engine builders, had struggled in the postwar period, building only two engines in the two years following the war. It remained in business only because Morgan could afford to weather the losses, but in 1866 he suffered an additional financial setback when his newly established shipping lines to Mexico were aborted due to the overthrow of Maximilian I of Mexico.

John Roach meanwhile was planning to add shipbuilding to his engine building business, and he saw the Morgan Iron Works with its dockyard on the East River as a stepping stone toward this goal. When in 1867 he offered to purchase the Morgan Works, Morgan was ready to sell, and the two agreed upon a price of $450,000 (equivalent to $10,366,071 in 2025), divided into a cash payment of $100,000 and two mortgages of $100,000 and $250,000. Roach would soon run into cash flow problems of his own and consequently defaulted on both mortgages; Morgan however chose not to foreclose and Roach settled the debts shortly before Morgan's death in 1878.

== Roach ownership, 1867–1907 ==
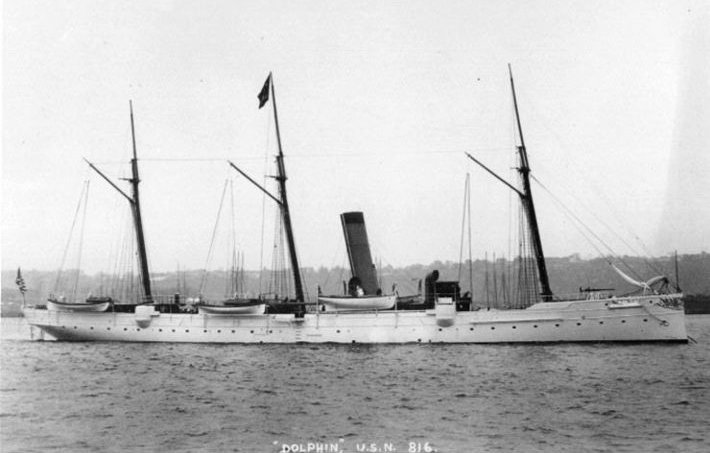
USS Dolphin, focus of a bitter political battle between John Roach and the U.S. Navy

By securing the premises of the Morgan Iron Works and buying out his remaining competitors, Roach had established a near ship and engine building monopoly in New York. He subsequently closed his Etna Iron Works, transferring the best personnel and equipment from Etna and his former competitors' premises to his newly acquired East River property, and thus turned the Morgan Works into America's premier manufacturer of marine steam engines.

In 1871, Roach bought the failed shipyard of Reaney, Son & Archbold in Chester, Pennsylvania, thoroughly modernized it, renamed it the Delaware River Iron Ship Building and Engine Works, and turned it into America's largest and most prolific shipyard, a position it maintained until the mid-1880s. In spite of the fact that the Chester shipyard had its own engine building plant, Roach retained ownership of the Morgan Iron Works, using it to build engines both for his own ships and for third party contracts, and also for ship repairs and outfitting of new vessels. Roach in fact expanded the Works for its new role, adding upholsterers for the production of ship's furniture and expanding the plumbing department. Additionally, he was able to use the Morgan Works to keep his business running during industrial action, when he would simply transfer his operations from one yard to the other. He retained the name of the Morgan Iron Works, but made it a subsidiary of a new management company, John Roach & Son (later John Roach & Sons).

After a costly political battle over a naval contract for the USS Dolphin in 1885, Roach, by now a terminally ill old man, retired and placed his business empire into receivership. Following the settlement of all his debts however, his family found themselves still in possession of both the Chester shipyard and the Morgan Iron Works. Roach's oldest surviving son, John Baker Roach, took over running of the business as a whole, while his younger son Stephen became treasurer of the Morgan Works.

The brothers continued to run the business much as their father had done, although it lost the pre-eminent position it had previously enjoyed. With the death of John Baker Roach in 1908, the Roach family decided to end its association with shipbuilding, and both the Morgan Iron Works and the Chester shipyard were closed. The Morgan Works was converted into tenements, and in 1949, the locality where the Works had once stood was redeveloped into a low-rental housing project, the Jacob Riis Houses, which still exists today.

== Production tables ==
The following tables list marine engines built by T. F. Secor & Co. and the Morgan Iron Works to 1867. Few engines built under Roach management are listed as Roach had a second marine engine facility at Chester, Pennsylvania and available records generally do not distinguish between the output of the two plants.

Where a ship had more than one name, the names are listed chronologically in descending order, with two digits representing the last two digits of the year the rename took place (where known). Ship names in small type preceded or followed by an arrow (← →) indicate that the engine for this vessel was used in another ship.

=== Merchant steamship and steamboat engines ===
Merchant steamship engines built by T. F. Secor & Co. (1838–1850) and the Morgan Iron Works (Morgan/Quintard management, 1850–1867) (Note: Fields left blank in the table indicate that the information is unavailable or unknown.)
Ship					Engine(s)				Ship notes/references
Name (Note: Name = ship name. Where the ship had more than one name in the course of its career, later names are listed chronologically in descending order, with each name followed by a two-digit number (in superscript) representing the last two digits of the year the rename took place, where known.)	Yr (Note: Yr = Year the ship was launched where known, otherwise, year the ship was completed or entered service.)	Builder	Ton (Note: Ship tonnage.)	Owner (Note: Abbreviations in this column include: SBC - Steamboat Company; RRC - Railroad Company; SSC - Steamship Company; SNC - Steam Navigation Company; TC - Transportation Company; SPC - Steam Packet Company.)	Tp (Note: Tp = type of engine. Engine types include: VB = vertical beam (ie walking beam); HB = horizontal beam (Lighthall patent); ST = steeple; CH = crosshead; SL = side-lever; O =oscillating; V = vertical (ie vertical inverted direct-acting).)	No (Note: No = number of engines.)	Cyl (Note: Cyl = cylinder size in inches.)	Str (Note: Str = stroke of engine in feet.)	Ship notes/references
Savannah	1838		305	Troy Line	VB				
Troy	1840	William Capes	724	Troy Line	HB	2	44	10	
Empire	1843	William H. Brown	936	Troy Line	HB	2	48	12	
Atlantic	1846	Bishop & Simonson	1112	Norwich & New London SBC	VB	1	72	11	
John Stevens	1846	Robert L. Stevens	686	Camden & Amboy RRC	ST	1	75	8	Early iron-hulled steamboat
Perry	1846	Devine Burtis	255		VB	1	36	9	
Thomas Powell	1846	Lawrence & Sneden	585	Thomas Powell et al	VB	1	48	11	Broken up, Port Ewen, 1881.
T. F. Secor	1846	Menemon Sanford	210	Menemon Sanford	VB				
Antelope	1847	Bishop & Simonson	425		VB				"New York owners"
New Orleans	1847	William H. Brown	869	Charles Morgan	VB	1	55	11	
Crescent City	1848	William H. Brown	1289	Charles Morgan	SL	1	80	9	
New World; →St. John ^{64}	1848	William H. Brown	1312	Isaac Newton	VB	1	76	15	
Ontario	1848	Merrick	832	American SBC	VB	1	50	11	
Queen City	1848	Bidwell & Banta	906	Charles M. Reed	CH				
United States	1848	William H. Webb	1875	Charles H. Marshall et al	SL	2	80	9	Early American transatlantic steamship
Connecticut	1848	Lawrence & Sneden	1129	Curtis Peck	VB	1	72	12	
Empire City	1849	William H. Brown	1751	Charles Morgan	SL	1	75	9	
Georgia	1849	Smith & Dimon	2727	U.S. Mail SSC	SL	2	90	8	
Goliah	1849	William H. Webb	333	Cornelius Vanderbilt	VB	1	50	8	NY tug; later a passenger steamer on the Pacific Coast
Ocean	1849	M. Sanford	658	Menemon Sanford et al	VB	1	48	11	(Note: Heyl erroneously names the builder as "Lawrence & Sandford", apparently confusing the builders with the owner. There was no such shipbuilder as "Lawrence & Sandford"; the builder was Lawrence & Sneden.)
Ohio	1849	Bishop & Simonson	2432	U.S. Mail SSC	SL	2	90	8	
Gold Hunter; USCS Active ^{52}	1849	J. A. Westervelt	436	William Skiddy	SL	2			Sent to California, later the U.S. Coast Survey ship Active
Boston	1850	William H. Brown	630	Menemon Sanford	VB	1	44	11	Last engine built by T. F. Secor & Co. New England passenger steamer, later USN Civil War transport; sunk by enemy fire, 1864
Louisiana	1850	Westervelt & Mackay	1056	Charles Morgan	VB	1	56	10	First engine built by the Morgan Iron Works. Vessel burned and sank Galveston Bay 1857, 30-60 killed
Prometheus	1850	J. Simonson	1207	Cornelius Vanderbilt	VB	2	42	10	First oceangoing steamship fitted with walking beam engine
Reindeer; →Perseverance	1850	Thomas Collyer	790	New Brunswick SBC	VB	1	56	12	Sunk by boiler explosion and fire, Hudson R., 1852; 36 killed
St. Lawrence	1850	William Collyer	588		VB	1	44	11	
Brother Jonathan	1851	Perine, Patterson & Stack	1359	Edward Mills	VB	1	72	11	Struck and sank off Crescent City, CA, 1865; 221 killed
Mexico; CSS General Bragg ^{62}; USS General Bragg ^{62}; Mexico ^{65}	1851	William Collyer	1043	Charles Morgan	VB	1	56	10	USN gunboat, 1862–65. Sold foreign, 1870.
North American	1851	Lawrence & Sneden	1440	Cornelius Vanderbilt	VB	1	60	12	Sunk, 1852.
Roanoke	1851	Westervelt & Mackay	1071	New York & Virginia SSC	VB	2	42	10	Seized by Confederacy and burned, 1864.
Winfield Scott	1851	Westervelt & Mackay	1291	Davis, Brooks & Co	SL	2	66	8	Struck and sank off Anacapa Island, CA, 1853
City of Hartford; Capitol City ^{82}	1852	Samuel Sneden	814	Hartford & New York SBC	VB	1	60	12	Run aground and wrecked in Long Island Sound, 1888
Saratoga; Cortes ^{52}	1852	Westervelt & Mackay	1117	Davis, Brooks & Co	VB	2	42	10	Destroyed by fire, Shanghai, China, 1865
Northern Indiana	1852	Bidwell & Banta	1475	Michigan Southern RRC	VB	1	72	12	Destroyed by fire 1856; 56 killed
←Reindeer ^{50}; Perseverance	1852	J. A. Westervelt	827	Charles Morgan	VB	1	56	12	Destroyed by fire at Indianola, Texas, 1856
Texas; Quartz Rock ^{52}; Sierra Nevada ^{52}	1852	William Collyer	1246	Empire City Line					Grounded and wrecked off San Simeon, CA, 1869
Southern Michigan; →Thomas Cornell	1852	Bidwell & Banta	1470	Michigan Southern RRC	VB	1	72	12	Laid up, 1857; scrapped 1863
Crescent City; →Morning Star	1853	Vincent Bidwell	1746	Dean Richmond et al	VB	1	80	12	Laid up, 1857; scrapped 1863
George Law; SS Central America ^{57}	1853	William H. Webb	2141	U.S. Mail SSC	O	2	65	10	Foundered and sank in hurricane; 420 killed
Golden Age; Hiroshima Maru ^{75}	1853	William H. Brown	2281	New York & Australia SNC	VB	1	83	12	In service until about 1890
Granite State	1853	Samuel Sneden	887	Chester W. Chapin	VB	1	52	12	Destroyed by fire, 1883
Jamestown; CSS Thomas Jefferson ^{61}	1853	J. A. Westervelt	1300	NY & Virginia SSC	VB	2	40	10	Sunk by the Confederacy to make an obstruction in the James River, 1862
Josephine	1853		552		VB	2	40	14	
San Francisco	1853	William H. Webb	2272	Pacific Mail SSC	O	2	65	8	Scuttled after engine failure during storm on maiden voyage, 1854; 195 killed
Charles Morgan; CSS Governor Moore ^{62}	1854	Westervelt & Son	1215	Charles Morgan	VB	1	60	11	Exploded during Battle of Forts Jackson and St. Philip, 1862
Nautilus	1854		898	Charles Morgan	VB	1	44	11	Wrecked on Last Island, LA in hurricane, 1856; 20 killed
Orizaba	1854	J. A. Westervelt	1335	Charles Morgan	VB	1	65	11	Scrapped, 1887
Sonora	1854	J. A. Westervelt	1616	Pacific Mail SSC	VB	2	50	10	Scrapped, 1868
St. Louis	1854	J. A. Westervelt	1621	Pacific Mail SSC	VB	2	50	10	Dismantled at Panama, 1878
Commonwealth	1855	Lawrence & Foulks	1732	Norwich & New London SBC	VB	1	76	12	Destroyed by fire at Groton, CT, 1865 "[T]he great boat of Long Island Sound in the '50s."
Island Home	1855	E. S. Whitlock	481	Nantucket & Cape Cod SBC	VB	2	40	11	Converted to barge, 1896–97; sunk in NY Harbor, 1902
Christoval Colon	1856	Sneden & Whitlock	450		VB	1	48	10	Built for Cuban service
Everglade; CSS Savannah ^{61}; Oconee ^{63}	1856	Sneden & Whitlock	406	"Capt. Coxatter"	O	1	32	8	Built for Florida service before conversion to gunboat. Foundered in bad weather, 1863.
Fulton	1856	Smith & Dimon	2307	Havre Line	O	2	65	10	Scrapped, 1870
Eastern Queen	1857	John Englis	695		VB	1	48	11	
Independence	1857	Samuel Sneden	354	Capt. Ezra Nye	VB	2	32	8	"[F]or towing in the harbor of Valparaíso, S. A."
Yangtsze	1857	Thomas Collyer	1003	Russell & Co	O	2	38	8	Built for Chinese service; employed in the opium trade
City of Buffalo; →Morro Castle ^{63}	1857	Bidwell & Banta	2026	Michigan Southern RRC	VB	1	76	12	Laid up, 1857–63; bulk freight carrier, 1864; tow barge, 1866; abandoned 1875
Huntsville; USS Huntsville ^{61}; Huntsville ^{65}	1858	J. A. Westervelt	817	H. B. Cromwell & Co	V	1	56	4	Destroyed by fire, 1877
Montgomery; USS Montgomery; Montgomery ^{65}	1858	J. A. Westervelt	787	H. B. Cromwell & Co	V	1	56	4	Sunk in collision, 1877; 13 killed
Ocean Queen	1858	J. A. Westervelt	2801	Morgan & Garrison	VB	1	90	12	Scrapped, 1875
Alabama	1859	Samuel Sneden	510		VB	1	50	10	
De Soto	1859	Lawrence & Foulks	1600	Livingston, Crocheron & Co	VB	1	65	11	USN gunboat, 1861-68. Destroyed by fire S. of New Orleans, 1870
John Brooks	1859	Samuel Sneden	780	Naugatuck TC	VB	1	56	12	Broken up about 1897
Peiho	1859	Thomas Collyer	1113	Russell & Co	O	1	52	8	Built for China service
White Cloud	1859	Thomas Collyer	520		VB	1	44	10	Built for China service
Yorktown; CSS Patrick Henry ^{61}	1859	William H. Webb	1403	NY & Virginia SSC	VB	1	50	10	Burned and scuttled by Confederacy to prevent capture, James River, 1865 (Note: Heyl incorrectly lists the launch date of this vessel as 1853; in fact it was 1859.)
Bienville	1860	Lawrence & Foulks	1558	Livingston, Crocheron & Co	VB	1	68	11	USN gunboat, 1861-65. Destroyed by fire at sea off Bahamas, 1872; 41 killed
Flushing	1860	Samuel Sneden	333		VB	1	36	10	
Peruano	1860	J. A. Westervelt	570		VB	1	44	11	
William G. Hewes; Ella and Annie ^{62}; USS Malvern ^{63}; William G. Hewes ^{65}	1860	Harlan & Hollingsworth	747	Charles Morgan	VB	1	50	11	Wrecked on Colorado Reef off coast of Cuba, 1895
Zouave	1860	John Englis	750		VB	1	50	11	
Continental	1861	Samuel Sneden	686	New Haven SBC	VB	1	70	11	Barge, 1902; later broken up
Cosmopolitan; Havana; Paul Koch; Edmund Butler	1861	John Englis	774	Sanford's Independent Line	VB	1	50	11	Still in service 1903
Hankow	1861	Thomas Collyer	725		VB	1	48	12	Chinese service
Mary Benton; Walter Brett ^{66}	1861	G.E. & W.H. Goodspeed	365	Hartford & Long Island SBC	VB	1	44	10	Scrapped, 1897
New Brunswick	1861	John Englis	804	Portland SPC	VB	1	48	11	
Mississippi; South America ^{61}; USS Connecticut ^{61}; South America ^{65}	1861	William H. Webb	2150	NY & Savannah SNC	VB	1	80	11	Laid up, 1875; presumed scrapped
Chekiang	1862	Henry Steers	1264		VB	1	70	11	China service. Destroyed by fire at Hankow, 1865
Fohkien	1862	Henry Steers	1947	J. M. Forbes	VB	1	81	12	Reconditioned engine originally from St. Lawrence. Fast passage to China, 1863. Struck and sank off Chinese coast, 1865
New England; City of Portland ^{72}	1862	John Englis	852	International SSC	VB	1	52	11	Ran aground and wrecked, 1884
←Crescent City ^{53}; Morning Star	1863	Roosevelt & Joyce	2022	New York Mail SSC	VB	1	80	12	Laid up 1867; broken up 1872
Western Metropolis	1863	F. D. Tucker	2269	L. Brown	VB	1	74	12	Built for transatlantic service. Converted to sail, 1878 (Note: According to Heyl, the engine for this ship was originally installed in the Lake Erie steamer Empire State, then in the Lake Erie steamer Western Metropolis in 1856, before being installed in the 1863 Western Metropolis. Since Baughman lists neither Empire State nor the Lake Erie Western Metropolis among the vessels powered by Morgan Iron Works engines, presumably the engine listed here was a rebuild by the Morgan Works of another company's engine.)
←New World ^{48}; St. John	1864	John Englis	2028	People's Line	VB	1	85	15	
Gen. J. K. Barnes	1864	Lawrence & Foulks	1365	Atlantic Coast Mail SSC	VB	1	60	10	Sank in hurricane, 1878
Retribution; Golden Rule ^{63}	1863	Henry Steers	2767	Marshall O. Roberts	VB	1	81	12	Wrecked on Roncador Reef, Gulf of Mexico, 1865
Herman Livingston	1864	Lawrence & Foulks	1314	Atlantic Coast Mail SSC	VB	1	60	10	Scrapped after 1878
Oriflamme	1864	Lawrence & Foulks	1204	U.S. Navy	VB	1	60	10	Built for Civil War service but sold on completion. Scrapped, 1890
Albermarle	1865	Lawrence & Foulks	871	Atlantic Coast Mail SSC	VB	1	44	11	Barge 82; schooner 83; sunk in squall 85
Hatteras	1865	Lawrence & Foulks	868	Atlantic Coast Mail SSC	VB	1	44	11	Schooner barge 1882
Manhattan	1865	Lawrence & Foulks	1337	American & Mexican SSC	VB	1	66	11	Sunk, 1882
Paon Shun; Nevada ^{66}; Saikio Maru ^{75}	1865	J. Simonson	1691	T. W. Dearborn	VB	1	85	12	Scrapped on or after 1885 (Note: Heyl notes that the spelling of Saikio in the last name recorded for this ship is uncertain.)
New York; Tokio Maru ^{75}	1865	J. Simonson	2217	Cornelius Vanderbilt	VB	1	78	12	Scrapped, 1880s
Raleigh	1865	Lawrence & Foulks	868	Atlantic Coast Mail SSC	VB	1	44	11	Destroyed by fire off Charleston, SC, 1867; 24 killed
Rapidan	1865	Lawrence & Foulks	868	Atlantic Coast Mail SSC	VB	1	44	11	Disappeared en route to West Indies, 1886
Vera Cruz	1865	Lawrence & Foulks	1340	American & Mexican SSC	VB	1	66	11	Struck and sank near Oregon Inlet, 1866
Villa Clara	1866		1095		VB	1	52	4	
Cambridge	1867	John Englis & Son	1337	Sanford Line	VB	1	60	11	Wrecked off Georges Island, MA, 1886

Merchant steamship engines built by the Morgan Iron Works under Roach management (1867–1908) (Note: Few engines built under Roach management are listed as Roach had a second marine engine facility at Chester, Pennsylvania and records generally do not distinguish between the output of the two plants.)
Ship					Engine(s)				Ship notes/references
Name	Yr	Builder	Ton	Owner	Tp	No	Cyl	Str	Ship notes/references
Pilgrim	1881	Delaware Works		Old Colony SBC	VB	1	110	14	Largest simple (single-cylinder) walking beam engine ever constructed. Ship laid up 1912, broken up 1920.

=== Warship engines ===
U.S. Navy warship engines built by the Morgan Iron Works (Morgan management)
Ship						Engine(s)				
Name	Type	Class	Built	Builder	Disp	Type (Note: Type = engine type.)	No	Cyl	Str	IHP
USS Seminole	Screw sloop	Narragansett	1859	Pensacola Navy Yard	1235	HBA	2	50	2.6	250
USS Chippewa	Screw gunboat	Unadilla	1861	William H. Webb	691	HBA	2	30	1.6	
USS Katahdin	Screw gunboat	Unadilla	1861	Larrabee & Allen	691	HBA	2	30	1.6	
USS Kineo	Screw gunboat	Unadilla	1861	J. W. Dyer	691	HBA	2	30	1.6	
USS Mahaska	Double-end gunboat	Sebago	1861	Portsmouth Navy Yard	1070	IDA	1	44	7	
USS Wachusett	Screw sloop	Iroquois	1861	Boston Navy Yard	1488	HBA	2	50	2.6	1202
USS Ticonderoga	Screw sloop	Lackawanna	1862	Brooklyn Navy Yard	2526	HBA	2	42	2.6	1300
USS Tioga	Double-end gunboat	Genesee	1862	Boston Navy Yard	1120	IDA	1	48	7	
USS Ascutney	Double-end gunboat	Sassacus	1863	George W. Jackman Jr.	1173	IDA	1	58	8.9	
USS Chenango	Double-end gunboat	Sassacus	1863	J. Simonson	1173	IDA	1	58	8.9	
USS Onondaga	Monitor	Unique	1863	Continental Iron Works	2592	HBA	4			642
USS Ammonoosuc	Cruiser	Ammonoosuc	1864	Boston Navy Yard	3850	HGDA	2	100	4	4480
USS Muscoota	Double-end gunboat	Mohongo	1864	Continental Iron Works	1370	IDA	1	58	8.9	
USS Idaho	Cruiser	Unique	1864	Henry Steers	3241	GS	2			
