= Henry Eckford (steamboat) =

History
- Name: Henry Eckford
- Namesake: New York City shipbuilder Henry Eckford (1775-1832)
- Owner: Mowatt Brothers & Co.
- Route: New York City–Albany, New York
- Builder: Lawrence & Sneden (NY)
- Completed: 1824
- In service: 1824-41
- Refit: As a coal barge, 1841
- Fate: Broken up after 1851

General characteristics
- Type: Passenger-cargo steamboat
- Tons burthen: 150
- Length: 105 ft
- Installed power: Woolf double cylinder (compound) vertical crosshead steam engine, operating at 100 psi.
- Propulsion: Paddlewheels
- Speed: 10mph

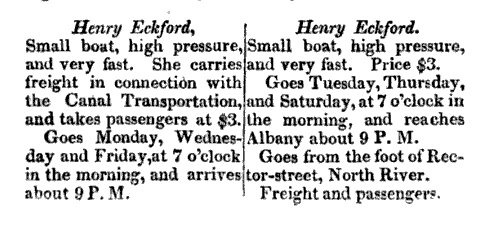
1825 advertisement for the services of Henry Eckford.

Henry Eckford was a small passenger-cargo steamboat built in New York in 1824. She was the first steam vessel in the world to be installed with a compound engine, almost fifty years before the technology would become widely adopted for marine use.

== Construction ==
Henry Eckford, named in honor of the renowned New York shipbuilder of the era, was built for Mowatt Brothers & Co. by Lawrence & Sneden of Manhattan, New York, in 1824. The machinery for the vessel was subcontracted to the Allaire Iron Works of James P. Allaire, who installed a compound engine (commonly known at the time as a "Woolf double cylinder" engine). Although the compound engine with its greater efficiency was already a well established technology, having been patented by British inventor Arthur Woolf almost twenty years earlier, such an engine had never before been used to power a ship. (Note: "In 1824 James P. Allaire built the first compound engine for the Henry Eckford ... ") (Note: "Two notable improvement were made in engines in the meantime ... in 1824 James P. Allaire, who had made a reputation as an engine builder, brought out a "compound" engine ... the Henry Eckford, the Sun, and a number of others were brought out on this principle ... But curiously enough, it was not until about 1870 that compound engines became the fashion.") (Note: "In 1825, James P. Allaire, of New York, built compound engines for the Henry Eckford ... Erastus W. Smith afterward introduced this form of engine on the Great Lakes, and still later they were introduced into British steamers.") (Note: "Allaire used the compound engine, with steam at a pressure of one hundred pounds [psi] and upward, in 1825, for the first time in steam-navigation. The first of his vessels of this class was the Henry Eckford ... ")

Henry Eckford's compound engine was of the vertical crosshead type. It had two cylinders—a high-pressure cylinder 12 inches in diameter and a 24 inch low-pressure cylinder—and a stroke of 4 feet. The engine operated at a pressure of about 100 psi (700 kPa), well above the 10 to 20 psi (70 to 140 kPa) common to marine steam engines of the period.

While the higher pressure was necessary for the compound engine to fully utilize its greater efficiency, it may account for the fact that this type of engine remained unpopular in marine applications long after its invention, as boiler explosions were not uncommon on early steamboats and higher pressures made for more violent explosions. After Henry Eckford, Allaire would go on to install several more steamboats with compound engines, decades before the technology was to achieve widespread acceptance in marine applications.

== Service history ==
Henry Eckford was initially employed as a passenger-and-freight steamer, running on the Hudson River between Rector St., North River, New York City and Albany, New York. Advertised as a "very fast" boat, the steamer had a speed of around 10 mph (16 km/h), and could complete a one-way trip in about 14 hours. The price of a full ticket was $3, with intermediate stops charged in proportion to distance travelled.

In 1825, the Mowatts decided to try using the boat to tow barges. Since no steamboat had previously been utilized in such a role, the proposal was widely greeted with scepticism, but in the first attempt, Henry Eckford pulled two barges from New York to Albany in 24 hours, a commercially viable time. The principle having been established, other steamboat owners quickly followed suit, and steam towboats soon became a commonplace. Henry Eckford herself would thereafter spend much of her career as a towboat. However, she also continued to carry passengers, and in 1826 the steamer's cabin was converted to passenger accommodation. By this time, the fare from New York to Albany had dropped to a dollar.

In the 1830s, Henry Eckford was placed on the route between New York and Norwich, Connecticut. Eventually superseded by newer, faster steamboats, Henry Eckford spent her later years as a towboat in New York Harbor.

=== Boiler explosion ===
On April 27, 1841, while getting up steam in dock at the foot of Cedar St., New York, to tow a canal boat, Henry Eckford suffered a boiler explosion. The two 19 ft (6 m) x 30 inch (5.8 by 0.76 m) wrought-iron boilers, with an aggregate weight of about 4 tons, were thrown thirty feet (9.1 m) toward the stern, wrecking the engine in their path, parts of which were thrown an additional twenty feet. The ship's engineer and firemen were hurled from the vessel by the force of the blast but escaped serious injury; however, a worker on board the canal boat, which was in the process of being secured to the steamer, was killed by a piece of flying metal.

In the subsequent inquest, no blame was attributed to any party, though a tardy government inspection was considered a possible contributing factor. The boiler had reached only about 50 psi (340 kPa) when the blast occurred, well below its normal operating pressure. Cause of the explosion was determined to be extreme internal corrosion, which in some places had reduced the boiler plates to a fraction of their original 1/4 inch (6.4 mm) thickness. The boilers had been installed 11 years prior and had an expected lifespan of approximately 15 years.

After the explosion, Henry Eckford's wrecked machinery was removed and the hull was converted into a coal barge, which was still in service as late as 1851. The barge was eventually broken up.
