= Orus (1842 ship) =

American steamship

History

United States
- Name: Orus
- Builder: Bishop & Simonson (New York, NY)
- Launched: 1842
- Refit: 1845
- Fate: Wrecked in Nicaragua November 9, 1850

General characteristics as rebuilt in 1845
- Displacement: 247 tons
- Length: 158 ft 7 in (48.34 m)
- Beam: 21 ft (6.4 m)
- Draft: 7 ft 8 in (2.34 m)
- Installed power: 2 steam engines
- Propulsion: Side-mounted paddlewheels

Orus was a wooden side-wheel steamship built in 1842. After a short commercial career connecting ports in New Jersey to lower Manhattan, she was employed in some of the earliest attempts to develop transcontinental shipping routes across Panama and later, across Nicaragua. She was wrecked in 1850 attempting to ascend the San Juan River in Nicaragua.

== Construction and characteristics ==
Pioneering steamboat engine manufacturer James P. Allaire commissioned the construction of Orus. She was the fourth steamer Allaire had used, after David Brown, Frank, and Osiris, to transport goods from his iron smelter and foundry business in New Jersey, the Howell Works, to Manhattan.

Orus was built at the Bishop and Simonson shipyard at the foot of Sixth Street on the East River in 1842. As originally constructed, she was 135 feet (41 m) long, with a beam of 21 feet (6.4 m), and a draft of 7.7 feet (2.3 m). She was one of the first steamships with two lever-beam engines, each with a single cylinder 25 inches (64 cm) in diameter with a stroke of 8 feet (2.4 m). Her boilers were coal fired. In 1845 she was substantially lengthened. As rebuilt, she was 158.6 feet (48.3 m) long and displaced 247 tons.

It was reported that James P. Allaire was interested in classical literature and named the ship after Orus, a mythological Greek hero killed by Hector in the Trojan War.

== New Jersey service ==
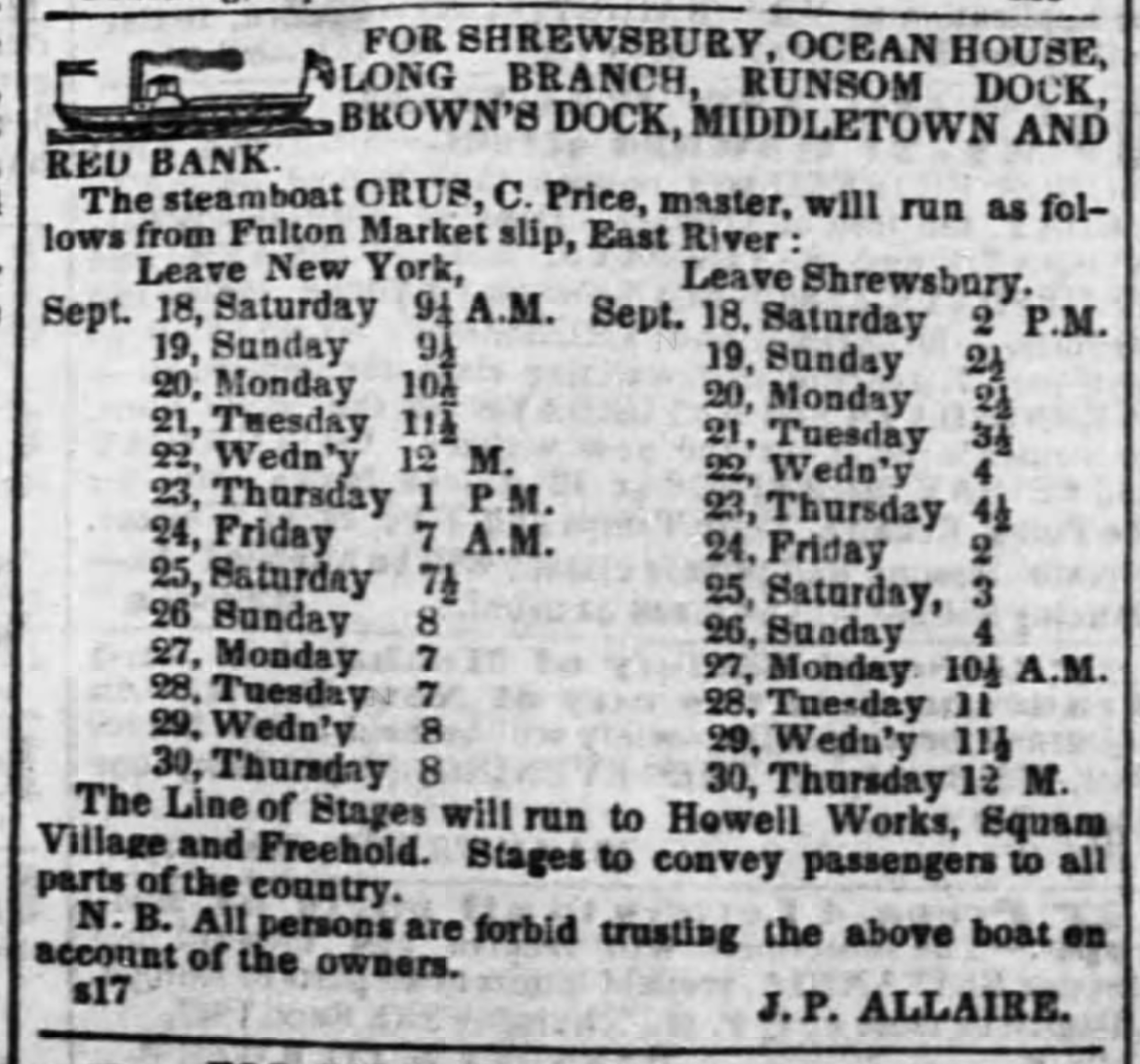
1847 advertisement for Orus' New Jersey service

Beginning in 1842 Orus made one round trip a day between the Fulton Market wharf in lower Manhattan and Red Bank, New Jersey. She stopped at Shrewsbury, Long Branch, Ocean House, Port Washington, and Middletown. The fare was 50 cents in 1843, but was raised to $1 in 1844. Orus spent much of her time during her New Jersey service under the command of Captain John Edward Allaire, J. P. Allaire's nephew. Stage coach lines were synchronized with Orus' schedule to carry passengers between Red Bank and Upper Squankum (now Farmingdale), Freehold, and the Howell Works.

The ship's career was, for the most part, uneventful, but she was involved in several rescues. On December 4, 1842 Orus towed the disabled bark Mallory from Long Branch, New Jersey to New York Harbor. On April 25, 1843 the starboard boiler of the steamer Mohegan exploded. Orus towed her and her 150 passengers back to safety. Orus saved another bark, Hecla, which went aground on Sandy Hook on October 26, 1847. Orus towed her into deeper water with minimal damage.

The last newspaper advertisement of Orus' New Jersey service was on November 21, 1848. Allaire sold her to the shipping company of Howland & Aspinwall which began a hurried refit for service in Panama.

== Panama service ==
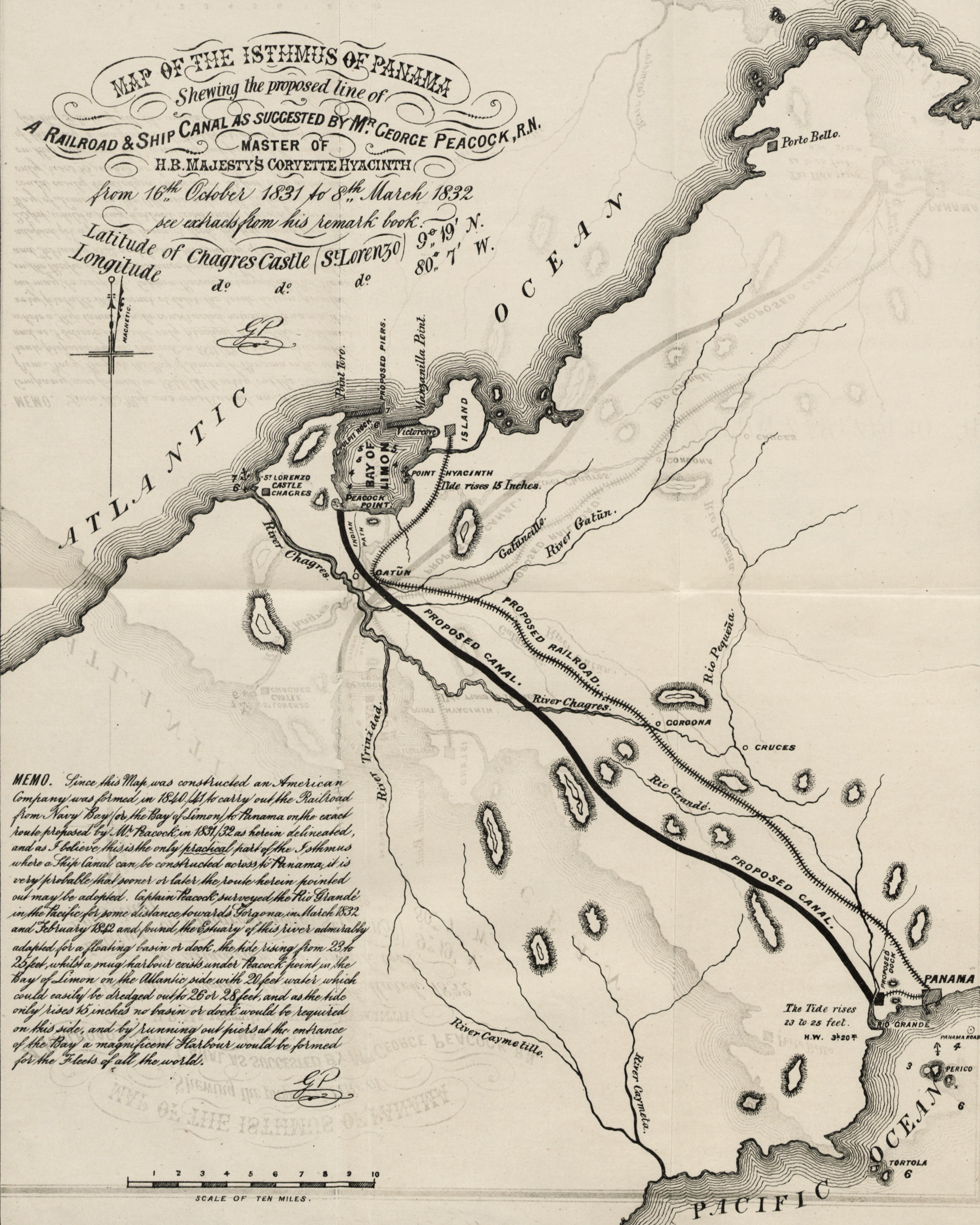
Map of the original route of the Chagres River. Note Gorgona, the supposed head of navigation is shown. Orus was never able to ascend the river that far.

The Mexican–American War brought the United States control of California in 1848. At that time there were only two ways to travel from the east coast of the county to the west coast. The first was to sail around Cape Horn at the southern tip of South America, and the second was to travel across the continent by land. Both routes were arduous, dangerous, costly, and slow. The shipping company Howland & Aspinwall believed that it could establish a superior shipping route across the 40-mile wide Isthmus of Panama. Ships from Atlantic ports would sail to Chagres, Panama, and ships from Pacific ports would sail to Panama City. Orus was purchased to ease travel between the two ocean ports. She was intended to connect with ocean-going ships on the Atlantic coast and take their passengers up the Chagres River to Gorgona. The steamer was to replace native canoes which had proven unreliable and of insufficient capacity. From the head of navigation at Gorgona, passengers were to walk or be transported by mule train for the remaining 20-mile trip to the Pacific Coast. In the midst of preparations for this new shipping route, word of the discovery of gold in California created significantly greater demand for travel.

On December 23, 1848 Orus sailed from New York, full of passengers, for Chagres. She stopped in Charleston, South Carolina for coal on December 31, 1848. She sailed for Nassau, Bahamas on January 2, 1849, reaching that port on January 5. After taking on more coal she sailed for Kingston, Jamaica the next day. She took on coal in Kingston and left there on January 11, 1849, finally reaching Chagres on January 14.

Orus was less useful as a river steamer than hoped. It was variously reported that even with her relatively shallow draft, she was unable to ascend more than fifteen or twenty miles up the Charges River. She was unable to reach Gorgona. In order to reduce her draft, Orus placed some of her passengers and freight in canoes and towed them up the river. Further, the tree canopy arched over the river in some spots forming a continuous roof that Orus' funnel was too tall to pass under. The charge for passage on Orus up the river was $10 per person.

Since Chagres had no harbor suitable for ocean-going ships, they were forced to anchor out at some distance from shore. In difficult weather conditions, they would anchor in Bahía Limón, ten miles from Chagres. Orus was sometimes used to shuttle passengers and freight ashore from these distant anchorages. It was reported that she would take as many as 150 passengers at a time.

Having largely failed in her role as river steamer in Panama, she was sold to a group led by Cornelius Vanderbilt, the Accessory Transit Company, which had a similar plan for her use in Nicaragua. She sailed from Chagres to her new work at San Juan de Nicaragua on August 13, 1850.

== Nicaragua service and loss ==
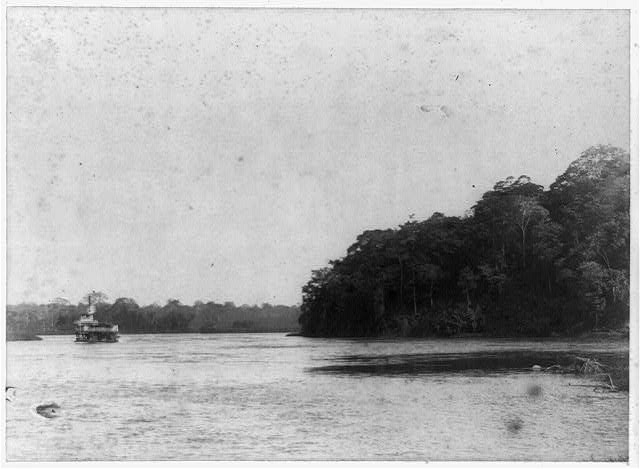
Sternwheel steamer Irma near Machuca Rapids on the San Juan River where Orus was wrecked.

A route from New York to San Francisco across Nicaragua is several hundred miles shorter than one across Panama, and thus potentially faster and cheaper. Vanderbilt acquired ocean-going ships for the Atlantic and Pacific legs of the journey, but still needed to get across Nicaragua. His plan was to sail shallow draft steamers from San Juan de Nicaragua on the Atlantic coast, up the San Juan River to Lake Nicaragua. They would land on the west shore of the lake only 15 miles from San Juan del Sur on the Pacific coast. Orus was to be renamed Nicaragua as she began her sailings on Lake Nicaragua. As she never reached the lake, contemporary press reports continued to refer to her as Orus. Whatever her name, she was intended to sail the upper part of the San Juan River and Lake Nicaragua.

Orus arrived in Nicaragua during the dry season when the San Juan River was low. No immediate attempt was made to ascend the river under those conditions and the ship lay at anchor in Greytown Harbor. During this idle period, company workers attempted to clear major obstacles in the San Juan River, including by blasting rocky shoals. When summer rains began to swell the river, Orus attempted to head upstream. In an echo of her difficulties in Panama, she was unable to cross the bar at the mouth of the San Juan River. It was too shallow. After several failures, she succeeded in reaching the San Juan from the mouth of the Colorado River, a southern offshoot, in August 1850.

Orus worked her way slowly upstream until she reach the Machuca Rapids, approximately 20 miles up river. Engineers blasted the rocks of the rapids for several weeks before it was thought safe to proceed. The ship was able to pass most of the rapids before the rushing water swept her downstream, out of control. She was wrecked in three feet of water with no hope of repair. Orus was wrecked on November 9, 1850. Her engines were salvaged and floated down the river on a raft with the intention of sending them back to the United States. However, even the raft went aground in the rapids and was destroyed. Orus' wreck remained a fixture in the river for several years, with sand and gravel piling up around it to create a small island. Trees grew on her deck.

One modern-day biography of Vanderbilt suggests that the Commodore took the helm aboard Orus and personally piloted her over Machuca Rapids and on to Lake Nicaragua, where he was said to have arrived on January 14, 1851. This cannot be true. Orus was wrecked before Vanderbilt left New York for Nicaragua aboard the steamer Prometheus on December 26, 1850. Another modern-day biography of Vanderbilt tells a similar story of the Commodore piloting the smaller steamer Director up the San Juan River and passing the wreck of the Orus on his way through Machuca Rapids. While dramatic and somewhat more plausible, this cannot be true either. There is ample evidence that the Director did ascend the entire river to reach Lake Nicaragua on January 1, 1851. However, this event occurred while Vanderbilt was still at sea enroute to Nicaragua.
