= Etna Iron Works =

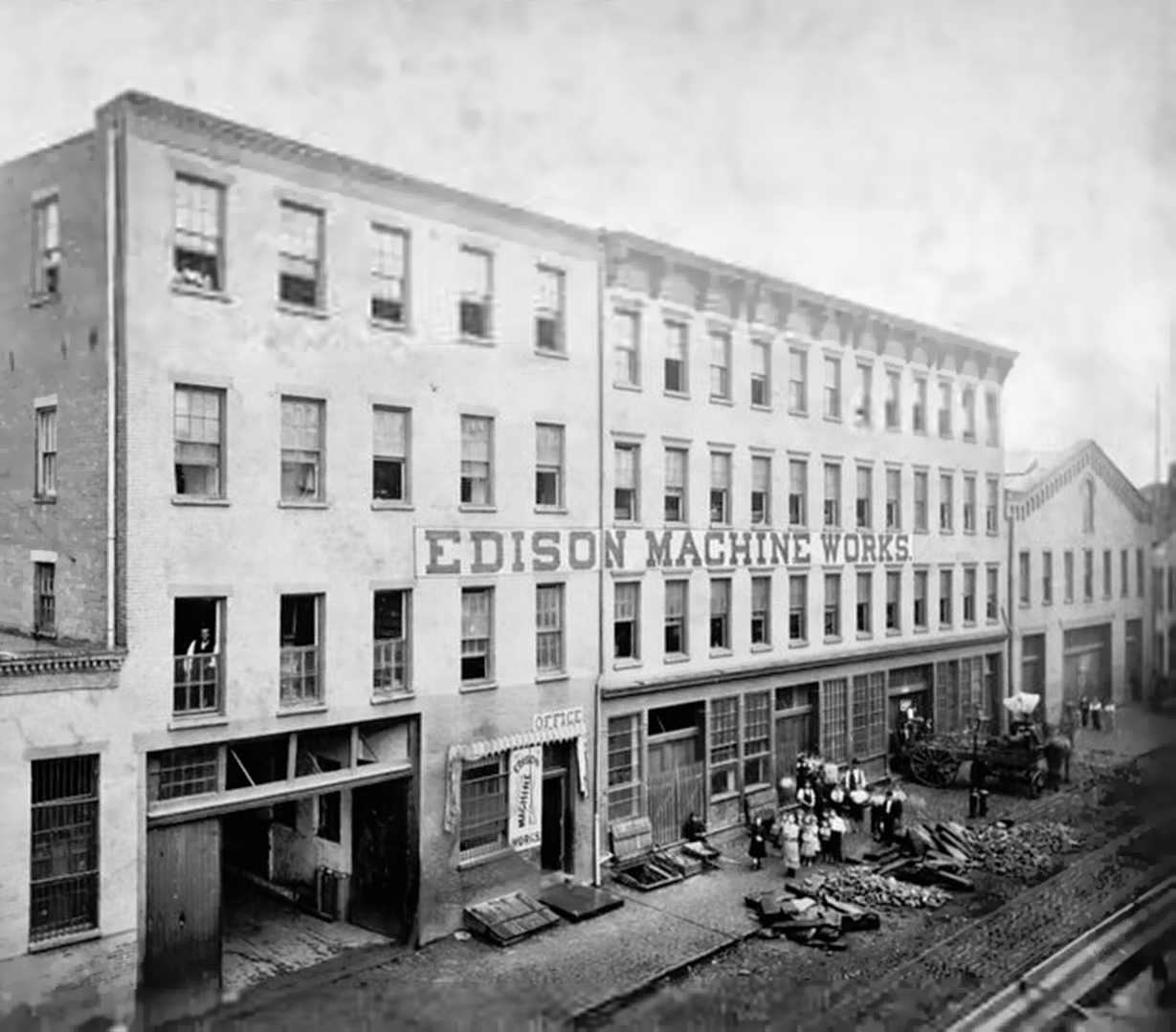
- The former Etna Iron Works after being rented by the Edison Machine Works in about 1881
- Type: Defunct (1881)
- Industry: Manufacturing
- Founded: 1852 (Note: The original date of foundation for the Etna Works is unknown. 1852 is the year the Works came under the management of John Roach and his fellow investors.)
- Headquarters: New York City, United States
- Products: Marine steam engines, machine tools, iron products
- Total assets: $150,000 (1860s)
- Owner: John Roach
- Number of employees: 2,000 (1860s)

The Etna Iron Works (name sometimes rendered Ætna Iron Works) (Note: "Etna" was a popular name for ironworking establishments in the 19th century. The Etna Iron Works in New York should not be confused with two similarly named prominent businesses of the period, the Etna Iron Works of Ohio or the Etna Iron Works of Pennsylvania. The name "Etna" (and its alternative spellings "Aetna" and "Ætna") derives from the nymph Aetna in Greek mythology, after whom the volcano Mount Etna in modern-day Sicily is said to be named.) was a 19th-century New York ironworks and steam engineering plant, best known for its manufacture of marine steam engines during and after the American Civil War.

The Etna Works was a failing small business when purchased by ironmolder John Roach and three partners in 1852. Roach soon gained full ownership of the business and quickly transformed it into a successful general-purpose ironworks. He took advantage of the civil war to transform the Etna Works into one of New York's leading manufacturers of marine steam engines. By the end of the war, he was in a position to acquire the businesses of some of his major New York competitors, which had run into financial difficulties. Roach subsequently consolidated his operations at the Morgan Iron Works, and some time afterward rented the Etna Works to the inventor Thomas Edison, who turned it into a dynamo factory. The Roach family sold the former Etna Works property in 1887. The Etna Works buildings, along with the street on which they were located, were later liquidated in a city redevelopment.

Notable achievements of the Etna Iron Works include the building of the steam-operated Third Avenue Harlem Bridge in the 1860s, and the manufacture in the 1860s of the engines for the giant ironclad USS Dunderberg and for the passenger steamers Bristol and Providence, the latter two of which were the largest marine engines then built in the United States.

== Background ==
John Roach emigrated from Ireland to the United States in 1832 at the age of sixteen, eventually obtaining employment as a common laborer at the Howell Works of James P. Allaire at an initial wage of 25c a day. After securing an apprenticeship as an ironmolder at Howell Works, Roach later transferred to Allaire's other plant, the Allaire Iron Works in New York, where he learned the manufacturing method for marine steam engines. Roach would remain an employee of Allaire's for twenty years.

By the 1850s, Roach, concerned about the needs of a growing family and anxious to obtain a more secure financial future, began to consider starting his own business. He had been unable to save much money of his own—only $1,000 (equivalent to $38,700 in 2025)—but was able to persuade three of his co-workers at Allaire, including his brother-in-law Joseph Johnstone, who had savings of $8,000 ($309,600), to join him. The four partners mustered between them a total of $10,000 ($387,000).

In April 1852, Roach and his three partners purchased for the sum of $4,700 ($181,890) a small New York ironworks known as the Etna Iron Works, which had recently fallen into receivership. The ironworks, located at 102 Goerck Street, occupied a 40-by-100-foot (12 m × 30 m) property and consisted of a small foundry and some raw materials.

== Early years ==
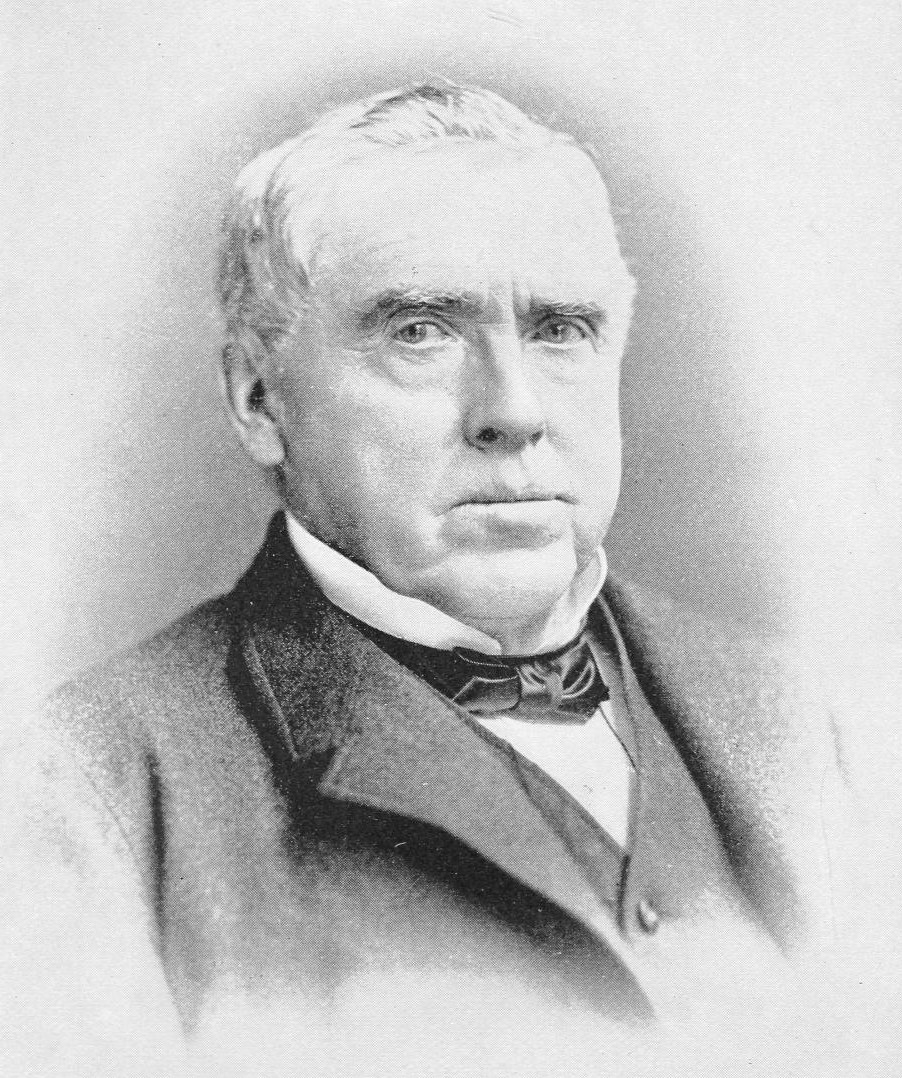
John Roach

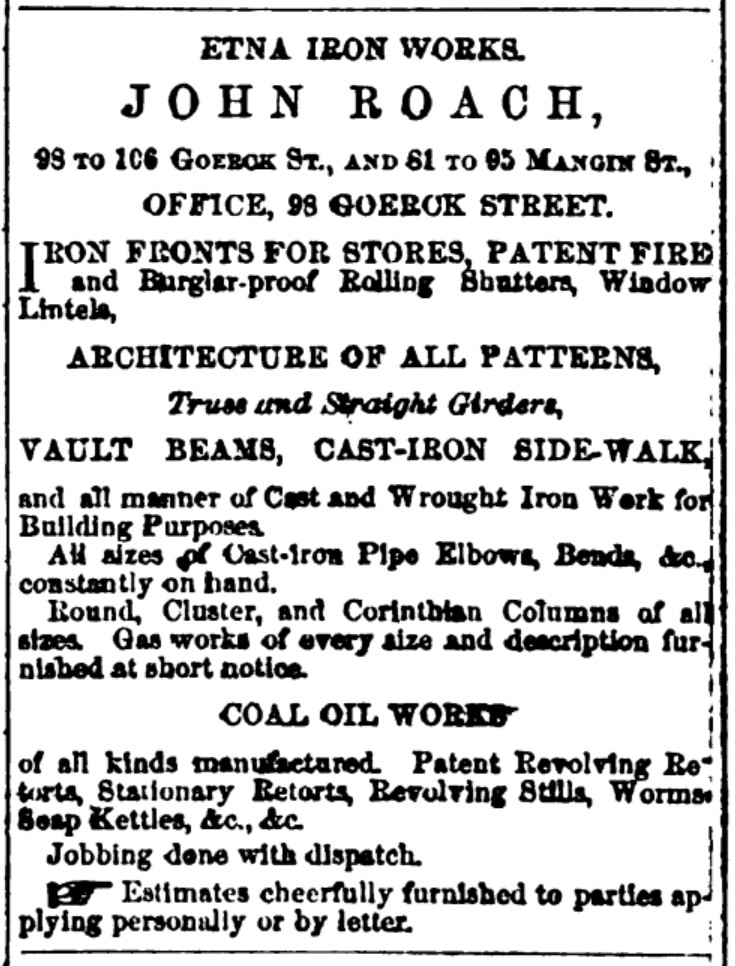
1861 advertisement for the Etna Iron Works

Following their purchase, Roach was given the task of promoting the business while his three partners attended to management of the shop floor. Roach began by touting for custom piecework, his first sale being for cast grate bars for a Brooklyn distillery.

By the end of the first year of operations, the partners had made a modest profit of $1,000, but now a dispute broke out over how to employ the money. Roach wanted to use it to expand the business, but his three partners voted to divide it into dividends of $250 each. Realizing that they had reached the limit of their ambition, Roach took out a mortgage on the property and used the loan to buy his partners out, thus becoming sole proprietor.

Roach thereafter began canvassing the local shipyards for business. Although New York's shipbuilders were still at this time constructing mostly wooden sailing ships, each ship needed about forty pounds of iron fastenings and cables, in addition to a number of anchors. In one ninety-day period, Roach made a profit from such sales of $8,000, giving his business a solid foundation.

Roach was able to continue expanding the business through the sale of a variety of products, including Franklin stoves, firebacks, slats for iron shutters and other items. In 1856 he added a new steam boiler to the ironworks for driving a blower which forced a draft into the melting furnace, thus obtaining a higher temperature and melting the iron faster, which saved valuable man-hours. He also purchased the adjoining property at 104–106 Goerck St., upon which stood a small three-storey building. Roach used the third floor as a pattern shop, while renting out the first and second floors to an iron shutter manufacturer.

By 1859, Roach was employing forty men and his property was valued at $15,000. A contemporary evaluator noted that Roach was "getting along well" and deemed him "safe for a fair amount of credit".

=== Foundry explosion ===
On September 2, 1859, the forced-draft boiler for the Etna Works' furnace exploded after accidentally being allowed to run dry, killing one man and seriously injuring two others, and gutting the building in which it stood. The $5,000 damage was covered by insurance, but the foundry would be forced to close without steam power.

Undeterred, Roach negotiated the use of a boiler in a neighbouring factory, ran 200 feet of pipe from their boiler to his workshop, and was back in production within 48 hours.

=== Windfall capital injection ===
In 1859, one of Roach's closest friends, a lawyer named John Baker, died and left Roach the trustee of his estate. The estate, worth $70,000, was entrusted to Roach for investment until Baker's four children came of age. Since the money could not be claimed until 1881, it was as good as a long-term interest-free loan to Roach, who was soon to take advantage of it to expand his business.

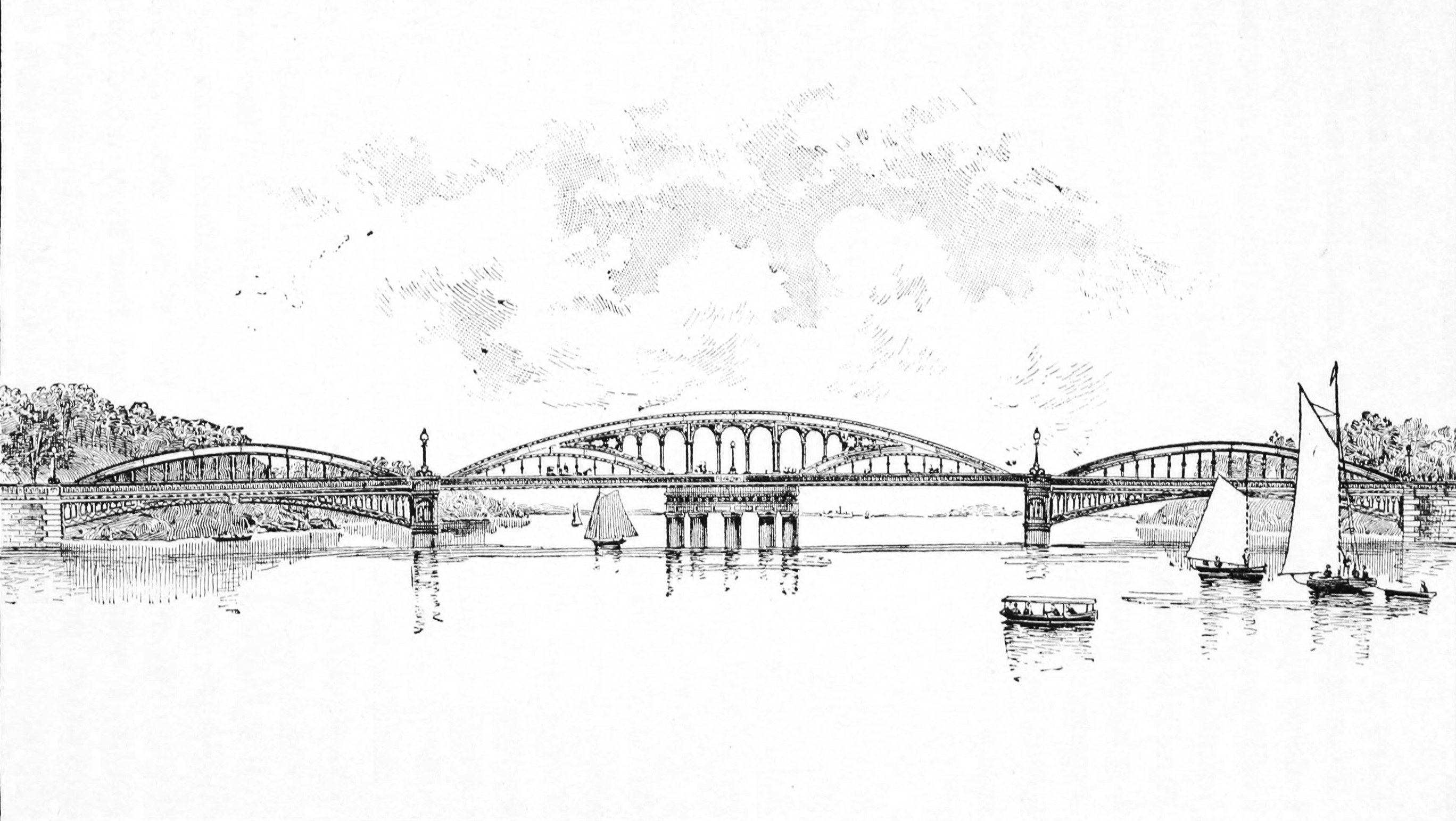
Third Avenue Harlem Bridge, completed in 1868

=== Third Avenue Harlem Bridge ===
One of the largest projects undertaken by the Etna Iron Works was for construction of the Third Avenue Harlem Bridge over the Harlem River, New York. The project was submitted to public tender by the City of New York in 1860 and Roach secured the contract with the lowest bid. The contract called for a bridge with a pivoting center section which could be rotated to allow large ships to pass through one of two channels beneath.

Roach had no prior experience of bridge building, so he hired an engineer with appropriate experience to design and oversee the project, and subcontracted out the masonry work. The bridge that was eventually constructed was 526 feet (160 m) long, with masonry foundations, a cast-and-wrought iron superstructure, and a 216-foot (66 m) steam-powered pivoting center section spanning two 80-foot-long (24 m) ship channels. The bridge opened for traffic in 1868, and operated reliably for about thirty years until increasing maintenance costs and traffic persuaded the city fathers to construct a new bridge with faster operation and higher and wider dimensions. (Note: The source erroneously states that the bridge opened in 1864.)

== American Civil War ==
Roach had long nurtured a desire to become a builder of marine steam engines like his mentor James Allaire. Competition in the industry was fierce, and entry difficult due to high capital costs, but Roach believed that by utilization of the best tools, labor-saving devices and practices, he could compete successfully. Accordingly, through the late 1850s he sent engineers to the United Kingdom to study the latest in marine engine technology, and was not above hiring himself out as a mechanic to New York's leading engine builders of the day to spy on their organization, technology and practices.

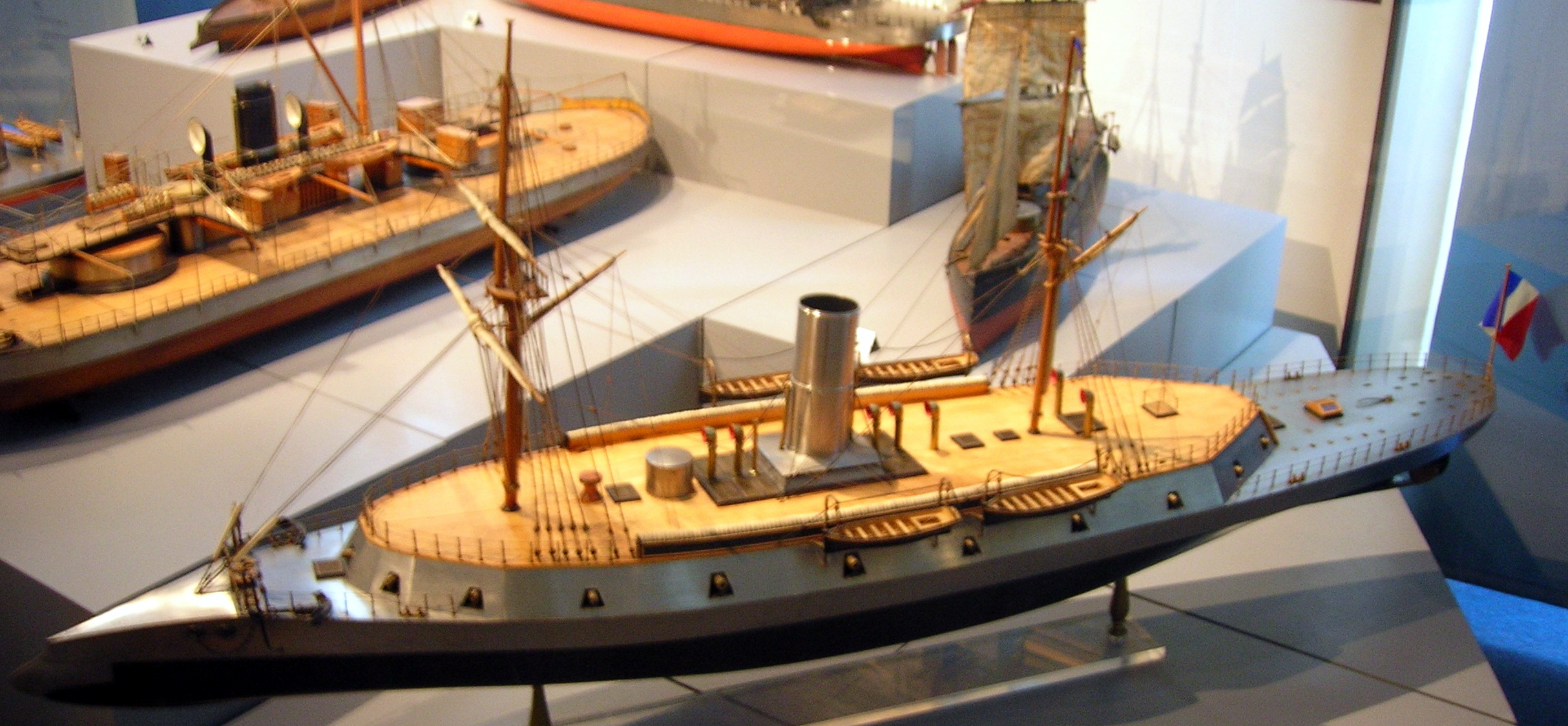
A model of the mammoth ironclad Dunderberg

When the American Civil War broke out in 1861, Roach was thus already well prepared to take advantage of the huge demand for marine engines generated by the conflict. He began by contacting the shipbuilder William H. Webb, who had just secured a contract for the huge new ironclad USS Dunderberg. Webb's usual engine suppliers, the Morgan Iron Works and Novelty Iron Works, were heavily inundated with orders and unable to meet his needs. Webb was so relieved to find an alternative source of supply, he not only awarded the Dunderberg's engine contract to Roach, but also became guarantor for the higher line of credit Roach would need to re-equip his works for completing the job.

Roach next travelled to Washington to meet the U.S. Navy's Chief of the Bureau of Steam Engineering, Benjamin Franklin Isherwood. On October 24, 1862, Isherwood awarded Roach a contract to supply the machinery for the Navy's new gunboat Peoria—the first of a number of such contracts Roach would fulfill for the Navy in coming years. Roach also secured the engine contracts for two new merchant steamships recently ordered by the newly established Neptune Steamship Company, Electra and Galatea.

Having secured these contracts, Roach set about equipping the Etna Iron Works for its new role. He began by hiring Thomas Main, a leading engineer with experience in a number of the world's most advanced engine works, as the plant's superintendent. Roach then began reorganizing the Works, adding a boilershop, machine shop, coppersmith shop and blacksmith, and equipping the plant with a host of new machines including traveling and swing cranes and the steam engines to power them, along with planers, lathes, boring mills, punches, shears and rollers. Amongst the new equipment was a planer capable of finishing 100-ton iron plates, and a lathe capable of boring a 112-inch-diameter (280 cm) cylinder—the two largest machine tools in the entire country.

Over the next two years, Roach's plant produced the engines for at least fifteen vessels, including return orders from the U.S. Navy and a dozen engines for the Van Deusen Brothers. At its wartime peak, the Etna Iron Works employed almost 2,000 workers and was valued at $150,000, putting it in the front rank of New York's engine builders.

== Postwar consolidation ==
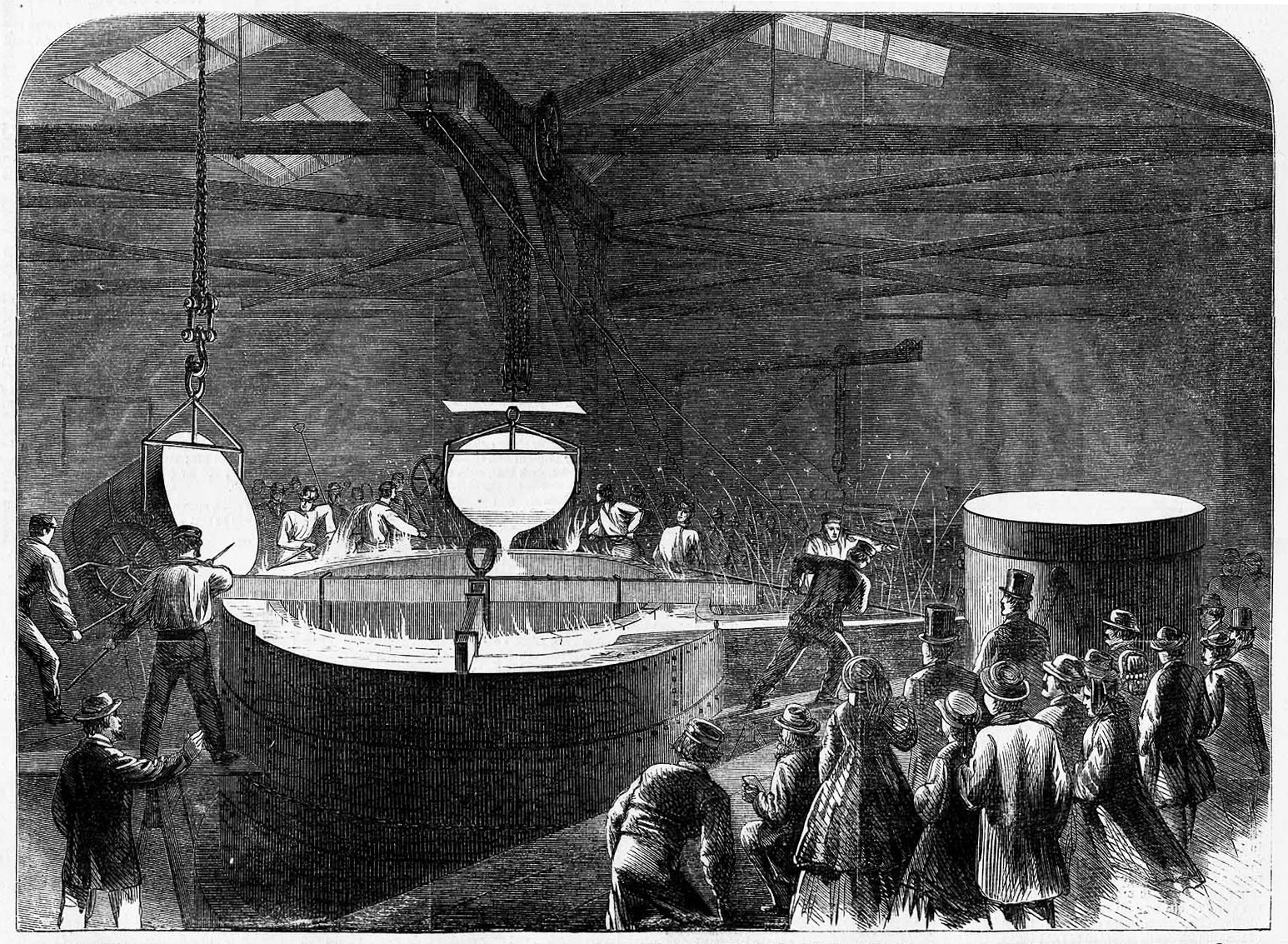
Casting an engine cylinder for either the steamboat Bristol or Providence at the Etna Iron Works, 1866. These were the largest-bore marine engines built in the United States at the time.

Shortly after the war, the U.S. Navy auctioned off hundreds of ships it had requisitioned for the war effort, flooding the market and seriously depressing prices. The resulting slump in the U.S. shipping industry sent many long-established American shipyards and marine engineers to the wall, and New York was one of the worst affected locations, with its maritime industry all but wiped out by the slump. By 1867, most of Roach's marine engine competitors had gone bankrupt.

Roach himself, however, was able to prosper during this time by securing a diversity of machinery contracts. The Navy through Benjamin Isherwood ordered three engines and six large boilers for the Guerriere class vessels, while shipbuilder William Webb contracted with Roach for the machinery for two large new sidewheel steamers, Bristol and Providence. The engines for the latter two ships, with their massive 110-inch (280 cm) cylinders, were the largest-bore ship engines ever produced in the United States up to that time. More importantly for Roach however, he realized that the government was planning to modernize its own shipyards, and he made a timely shift into the manufacture of machine tools in 1866. He was rewarded by the securing of almost a million dollars in government machine tool contracts between 1866 and 1868.

At this point, Roach decided that his business had outgrown its original location. He was keen to establish a plant with direct water frontage, which would both save him the cost of transporting his engines to the docks, and also enable him to move into the potentially lucrative business of ship repair. The obvious target for acquisition was the Morgan Iron Works, a leading ironworks with frontage on the East River, and which like most other marine engineering plants had lain mostly idle since the Civil War. Fortuitously for Roach, the proprietor, shipping magnate Charles Morgan, had recently experienced a setback in his own business dealings, as a result of which he was short of capital. Morgan quickly agreed to sell the premises along with all of its equipment for the sum of $450,000.

At around the same time, two of Roach's former competitors, the Allaire Iron Works and the Franklin Forge, went bankrupt, and Roach purchased the best of their equipment at firesale prices and also hired their best workers. To these he added the best workers and equipment from the Etna and Morgan establishments, and consolidated his operations at the latter, vacating his former premises at Goerck Street. Roach profited further at this time from the sale of his surplus equipment to the U.S. Navy, but on this occasion some rival business interests raised a protest and the deal became the subject of an acrimonious government inquiry (see the John Roach article for details).

== Later developments ==
Following the consolidation of his business at the Morgan Iron Works, Roach rented out his old Etna Iron Works property to various tenants. The Etna Works continued to operate as a general ironworks under new management until about 1881, when inventor Thomas Edison relocated production for his electrical illumination utility there. Edison renamed the plant the Edison Machine Works, using it to build DC dynamos until 1887. In that year, the Roach family business sold the premises, the Edison having moved their expanding Machine Works to a much larger site in Schenectady, NY. The property, along with the street in which it was situated, was later liquidated in a 1940s redevelopment.

Roach himself went on to establish his own shipyard in Chester, Pennsylvania, the Delaware River Iron Ship Building and Engine Works, which became America's largest and most productive shipyard from its establishment in 1871 until the mid-1880s.

== Marine engine production tables ==
At least 27 marine steam engines for 19 ships were produced by the Etna Iron Works. The following tables list those ships, together with basic details of the engines fitted to each.

United States Navy warship engines built by the Etna Iron Works, 1862–66
Ship							Engine				Ship notes; references
Name (Note: Name of ship. Where a ship had more than one name during its career, later names are listed chronologically in descending order, with each name followed by two digits (in superscript) representing the last two digits of the year the rename took place, where known. Yard names (names a ship was given at the shipyard prior to it receiving an official name) are represented by a trailing "y" (in superscript).)	Class	Type	Launched	Com.	Builder	Dsp.	No.	Cyl.; (ins)	Str.; (ins)	Type	Ship notes; references
USS Dunderberg; Rochambeau ^{67}	Unique	Ironclad	1862-10-05	Never (Note: i.e. in the United States Navy; the ship was later commissioned into the French navy.)	William H. Webb	7800	2	100	57	Horiz/BA	Largest, fastest and most powerful ironclad built for civil war service, but not completed until after the war and consequently not accepted by the Navy. Sold to France 1867 and renamed Rochambeau; scrapped 1874.
USS Winooski	Sassacus	Gunboat	1863-06-30	1865-06-27	Boston Navy Yard	1173	1	58	105	Inclined	Completed too late to see service in the civil war. Atlantic station 1866, Caribbean station 1867. Sold 25 Aug 1868.
USS Peoria	Sassacus	Gunboat	1863-10-29	1866-12-26	New York Navy Yard	974	1	66	120	Inclined	Completed too late to see service in the civil war. North Atlantic station, 1867. Sold 26 Aug 1868.
Neshaminy; Arizona ^{69}; Nevada ^{69}	Ammonoosuc	Screw frigate	1865-10-05	Never	Philadelphia Navy Yard	3852	2	100	48	Geared	Class designed by Bureau of Steam Engineering to be fastest ships afloat—and achieved such with top speed of 17 knots—but design was disliked by line officers. Ship built of unseasoned timber due to civil war shortages, and vessel never completed after hull declared "twisted" in 1869. Broken up 1874.
Java	Java	Screw frigate	Never	Never	Brooklyn Navy Yard	3954	1	60	36	Horiz/BA	Built for civil war service but never completed. Broken up on stocks, 1884.
Ontario; New York ^{69}	Java	Screw frigate	Never	Never	Brooklyn Navy Yard	3954	1	60	36	Horiz/BA	Built for civil war service but never completed. Broken up on stocks, 1888.

Merchant steamship engines built by the Etna Iron Works, 1864–66
Ship							Engine				Ship notes; references
Name	Type	Yr.	Builder	Ton.	Ordered by	Intended service	No.	Cyl.; (ins)	Str.; (ins)	Type	Ship notes; references
Electra	Steamship	1864	J.B & J.D. Van Deusen	1301	Neptune Steamship Co.	NYC—Boston	2	44	36	V/DA	Scrapped about 1884.
Galatea	Steamship	1864	J.B & J.D. Van Deusen	1301	Neptune Steamship Co.	NYC—Boston	2	44	36	V/DA	Scrapped about 1885.
Oceanus	Steamship	1864	J.B & J.D. Van Deusen	1301	Neptune Steamship Co.	NYC—Boston	2	44	36	V/DA	Destroyed by fire, 1868.
Doris	Freighter	1864	J.B & J.D. Van Deusen	1360	Neptune Steamship Co.	NYC—Boston	1	50	40	V/DA	Last documented 1886; possibly scrapped 1898.
Metis	Freighter	1864	J.B & J.D. Van Deusen	1238	Neptune Steamship Co.	NYC—Boston	1	50	40	V/DA	Grounded and wrecked after collision during storm near Stonington, CT, 1872; 50 killed.
Thetis; Pequot ^{66}	Freighter	1864	J.B & J.D.Van Deusen	1360	Neptune Steamship Co.	NYC—Boston	1	50	40	V/DA	Scrapped about 1910.
Glaucus	Freighter	1864	J.B & J.D. Van Deusen	1848	Neptune Steamship Co.	NYC—Boston	2	44	36	I/DA	Damaged by fire 1864, redesigned and rebuilt (as seen in photo) by Harlan & Hollingsworth. Scrapped at Boston, 1906.
Neptune	Freighter	1864	J.B & J.D. Van Deusen	1848	Neptune Steamship Co.	NYC—Boston	2	44	36	I/DA	Scrapped at Boston, 1905.
Nereus	Freighter	1864	J.B & J.D. Van Deusen	1848	Neptune Steamship Co.	NYC—Boston	2	44	36	I/DA	Converted to barge, 1894; lost at sea, 1895.
Leona ^{y}; Managua ^{y}; Nebraska	Steamship	1865	Henry Steers	2143	Central American Transit Co.	NYC—Nicaragua	1	81	144	VB	Built of unseasoned timber due to civil war shortages; scrapped 1878.
Rising Star	Steamship	1865	Roosevelt, Joyce & Waterbury	2726	Star Line	NYC—New Orleans	1	100	144	VB	Built with unseasoned timber due to civil war shortages; scrapped 1877.
Bristol	Steamboat	1866	William H. Webb	2962	Merchants Steamship Co.	Long Island Sound	1	110	144	VB	Destroyed by fire, 1889.
Providence	Steamboat	1866	William H. Webb	2962	Merchants Steamship Co.	Long Island Sound	1	110	144	VB	Scrapped at Boston, 1901.

Table legend—Engine type: BA=back-acting, DA=direct acting, SB=simple beam; Horiz=horizontal, Vert=vertical, Inv=inverted. See marine steam engine for an explanation of engine types.
