= Bristol (1866 steamboat) =

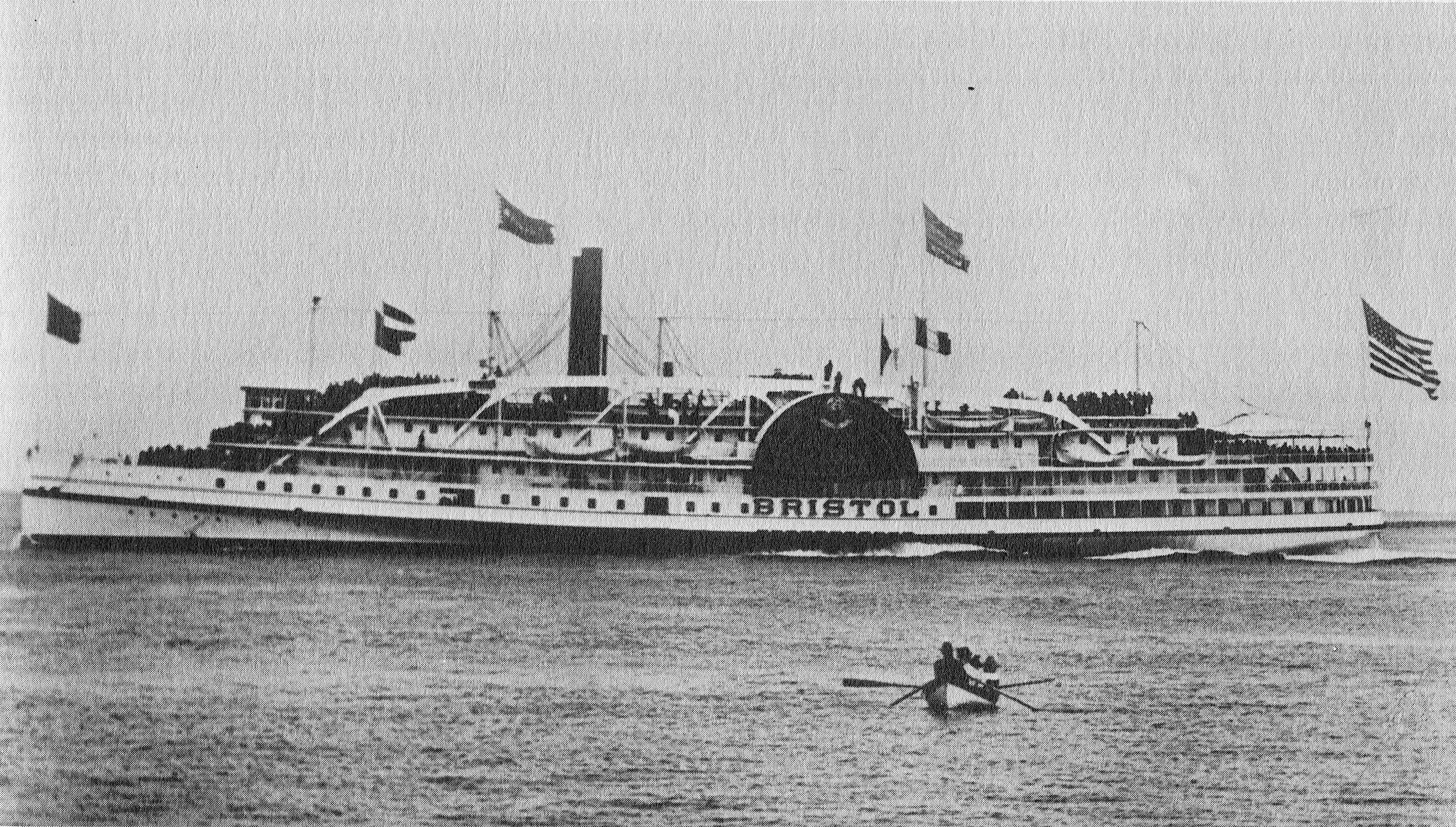
- Bristol

History
- Name: Bristol
- Namesake: Bristol, Rhode Island
- Operator: Fall River Line
- Route: New York-Newport-Fall River
- Ordered: About 1865
- Builder: William H. Webb
- Cost: $1,250,000
- Launched: 4 April 1866
- Completed: 1867
- Acquired: 1867
- Maiden voyage: June 1867
- In service: 1867–1888
- Fate: Destroyed by fire, December 30, 1888

General characteristics
- Type: Passenger sidewheel steamer
- Tonnage: 2,962 gross, 2,064 net
- Length: 362 ft (110 m)
- Beam: 48 ft 4 in (14.73 m), over guards 83 ft
- Draft: 10 ft 3 in (3.12 m)
- Depth of hold: 16 ft 6 in (5.03 m)
- Installed power: 1 × 110-inch-cylinder simple beam steam engine delivering 2,900 IHP @ 19 RPM, 3 × boilers
- Propulsion: 2 × 38 ft 8 in paddlewheels
- Capacity: 840 to 1,200 passengers plus 40 railcars of freight

Bristol was a large sidewheel steamboat launched in 1866 by William H. Webb of New York for the Merchants Steamship Company. One of Narragansett Bay's so-called "floating palaces", the luxuriously outfitted Bristol and her sister ship Providence, each of which could carry up to 1,200 passengers, were installed with the largest engines then built in the United States, and were considered to be amongst the finest American-built vessels of their era.

Both ships would spend their entire careers steaming between New York and various destinations in and around Narragansett Bay, Rhode Island. Bristol was eventually destroyed by a fire while in port in 1888.

== Development ==
Bristol and Providence owed their existence to a short-lived company known as the Merchants Steamship Company, which placed the initial order for the vessels with the Webb shipyard in about 1865. Merchants Steamship was an amalgamation of three existing Narragansett Bay shipping lines, the Commercial Line, Neptune Line and Stonington Line. The Company intended to run the two steamers between New York and Bristol, Rhode Island, in competition with the Fall River Line, which ran a similar service from New York to Fall River, Massachusetts (both Lines then linking up to railway lines that continued on to Boston).

== Construction ==
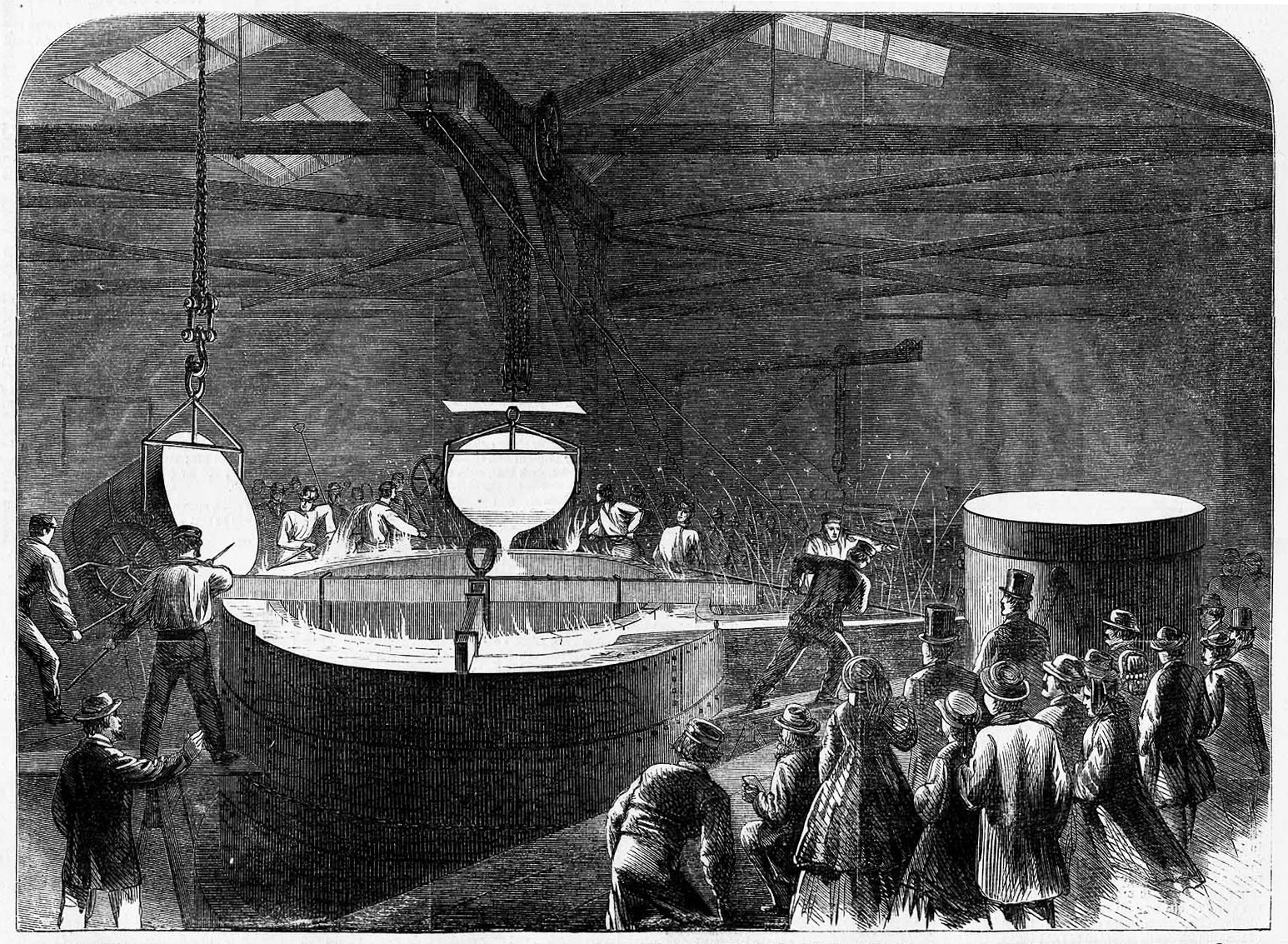
Casting the mammoth cylinder of either Bristol or Providence—probably Bristol—at the Etna Iron Works, February 3, 1866

Work on both Bristol and Providence was delayed by a long strike, but Bristol was eventually launched on 4 April 1866, and Providence on July 28 of the same year. Between December 1865 and December 1866 however, the Merchants Steamship Company lost three of its existing ships, all of which were uninsured, thereby bankrupting the Company. Bristol and Providence remained in an uncompleted state at the shipyard until a new company, the Narragansett Steamship Company, which was partly owned by financier Jim Fisk, bought the new vessels in early 1867 and paid for their completion.

=== Engines ===
Bristol and Providence were both fitted with massive 110-inch-cylinder (9 foot 2 inch), 12-foot stroke walking beam engines, the largest engines ever fitted to American vessels up to that time - larger even than the 100-inch-cylinder engines for the mammoth ironclad USS Dunderberg built at the Webb shipyard around the same time. The steamboats' engines, which operated at the stately pace of 19 rpm, were designed by Erasmus W. Smith and built by the Etna Iron Works, which had only recently installed a lathe capable of boring such huge cylinders. The lathe itself was one of the two largest machine tools in the United States, the other being a planer installed by the same company.

== Description ==
When completed, Bristol and Providence were amongst the largest and most lavishly outfitted American vessels of their time. They were the largest wooden-hulled steamers ever built for service on Long Island Sound and the first to have two full passenger decks above the main deck.

Each ship had 240 staterooms and over 300 berths, capable of accommodating 1,200 passengers, 840 of them in sleeping quarters. Their freight capacity was estimated at 40 railroad freight cars each. Their wooden hulls and paddle-boxes were strengthened with iron cross-bracings, while for safety they were installed with watertight compartments. The ships had gas lighting, and later on, steam heating and steam-powered steering. The decks, which were built of white oak, included an extra "gallery tier" deck from which passengers could view their surroundings.

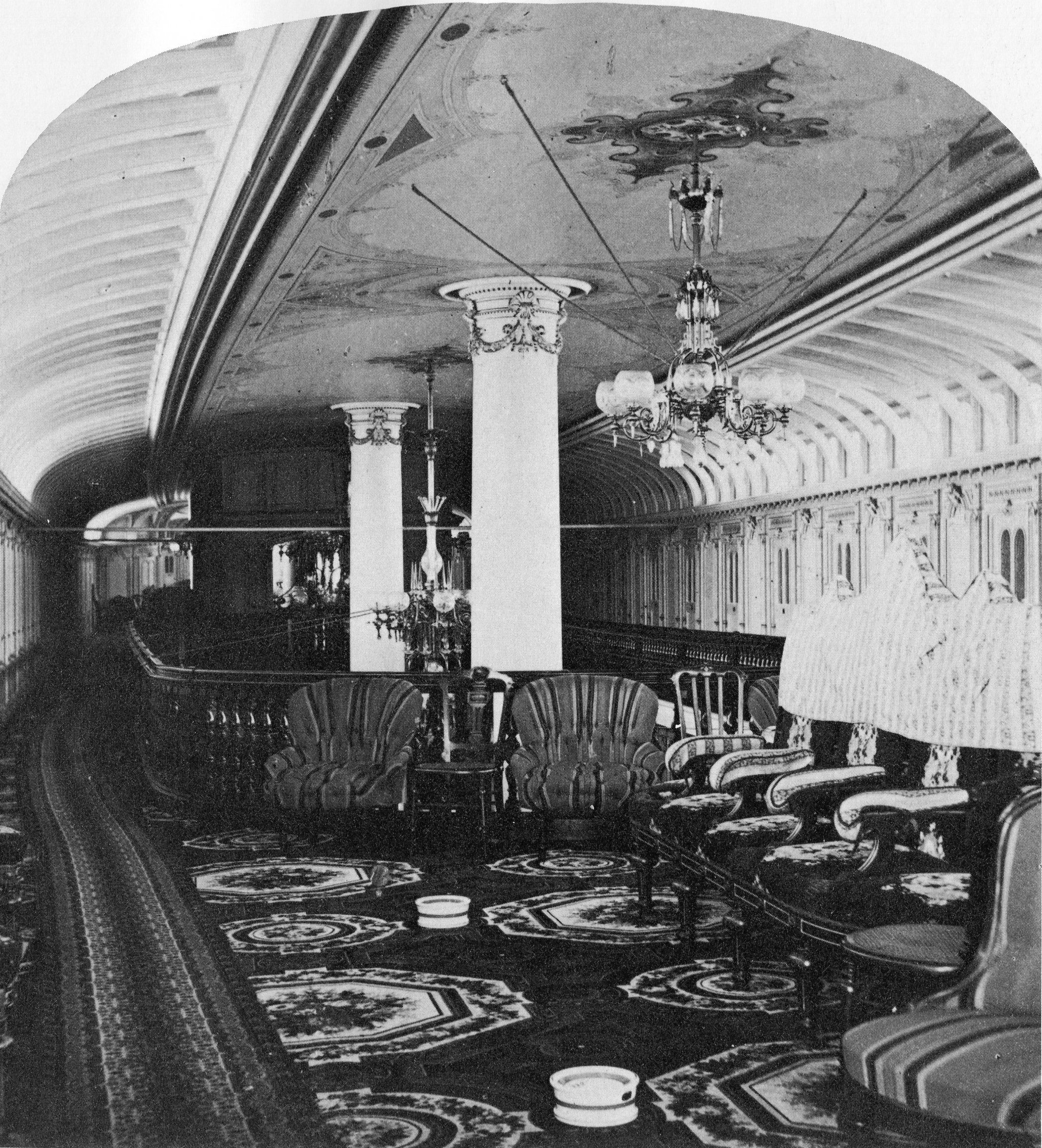
Interior of Bristol's saloon, showing the lavish appointments

Contemporary American observers gushed over the size and sophistication of the ships, lauding them as "world renowned mammoth palace steamers", "so far in advance of the type of steamboats heretofore built that they were looked upon as marvels" and "the finest specimens of marine architecture of their day." One observer described the interiors thus:

... The painting, by George C. Barker & Son, and the decorating by Hayman, of this city, have been a source of enormous outlay, but the result is an equivalent to the cost, for the passenger, on arriving at the Quarter Deck and proceeding to the Grand Saloon, must certainly imagine that he is in the halls of enchantment, only read of in the Arabian Nights' Entertainments. In each panel of the quarter-deck is painted a piece of statuary, while every nook and corner is covered with paint of the most delicate hue and finished off with an abundance of gilt. The appearance of the main saloon is really charming. Here, there, and everywhere, are flowers and birds, the one, in some cases, just appearing to blossom and the other, apparently, just waiting to spring from a branch, whereon it is perched, so naturally is everything done. In the main saloon, ladies' saloon, and social hall, may be seen very delightful specimens of good taste in the selection of the new velvet carpets, rugs, mats, silk curtains, lace curtains, etc., all of which are of the very costliest kind. The whole of the furniture in the grand saloon and ladies' saloon is covered in plum colored velvet, while that of the social hall is done in velvet and rep, each having a very beautiful effect on the surroundings ...

As a finishing touch, owner Jim Fisk had 250 canaries in cages installed in each ship, each bird personally named by Fisk himself.

Bristol and Providence began a tradition of luxury travel on Narragansett Bay that would remain a popular attraction to travellers for the next fifty years. For a modest price, an ordinary working person could gain a glimpse of the opulent lifestyles of the wealthy just by taking a cruise on such a vessel.

== Service history ==
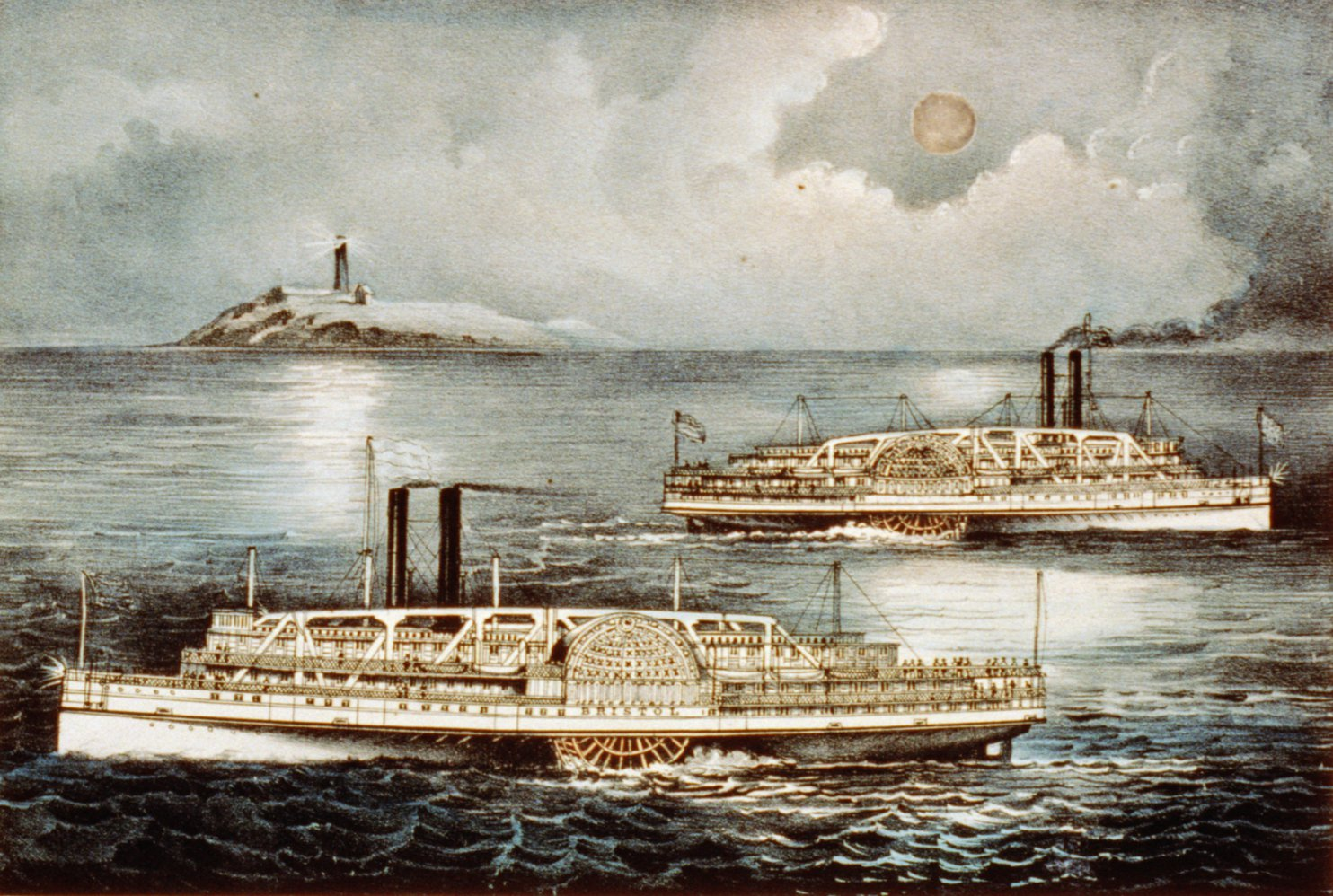
A lithograph of Bristol (foreground) passing her sister Providence at midnight on Long Island Sound

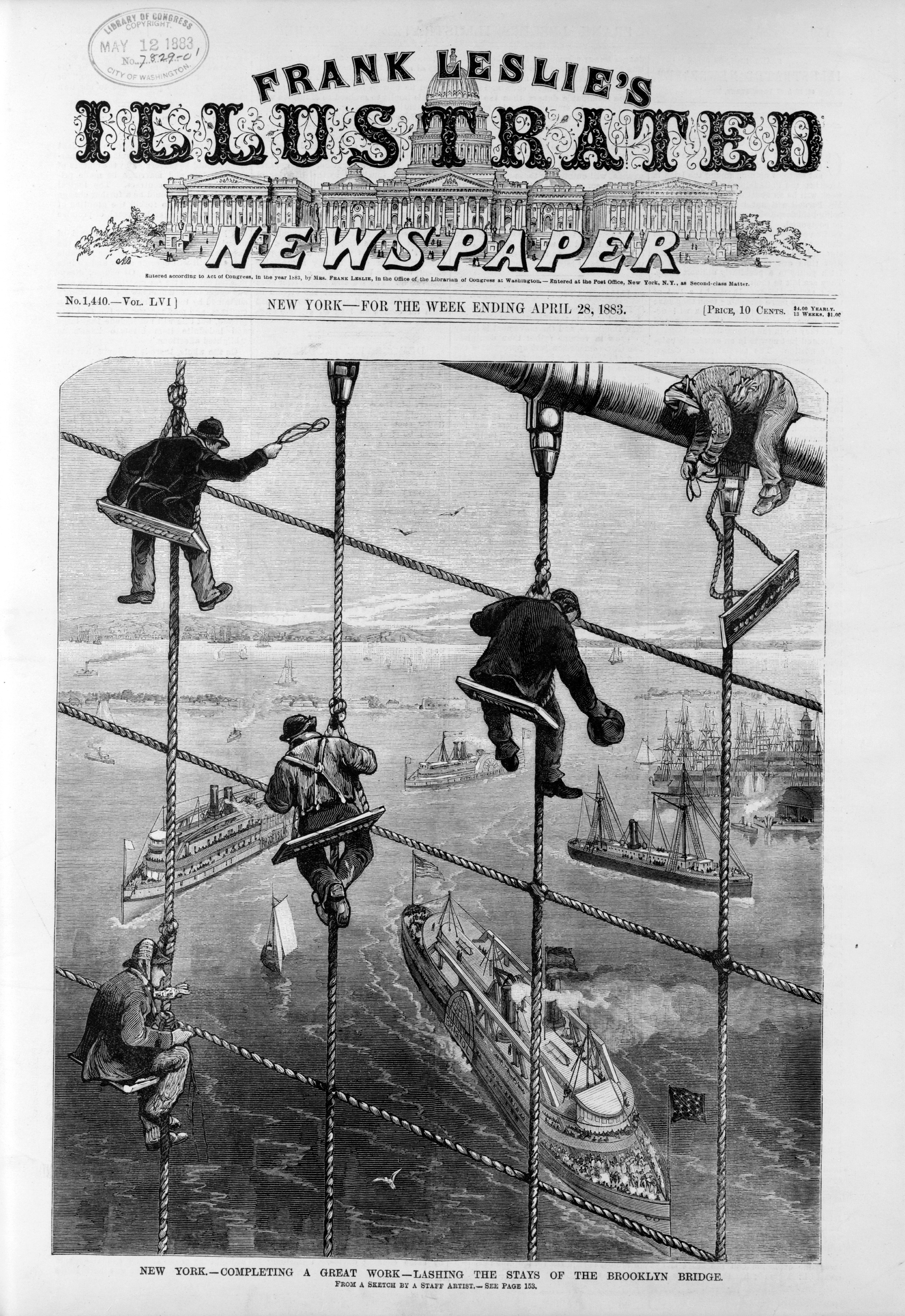
On the cover of Frank Leslie's Illustrated Newspaper, the Bristol is one of the ships shown passing under the newly completed Brooklyn Bridge .

Bristol made her maiden voyage in June 1867, and for the next two years was to maintain the run from New York to Bristol, Rhode Island, as part of the Narragansett Steamship Company's Bristol Line. In 1869, the Narragansett Steamship Company merged with the Boston, Newport and New York Steamboat Company, and Bristol and her sister ship Providence thus joined the latter company's Fall River Line. The two vessels began running from New York to Fall River, Massachusetts, with a stop at Newport, Rhode Island, while the service to Bristol was discontinued. Bristol would subsequently maintain the New York-Fall River route to the end of her career.

=== Innovations in customer service ===
An advertisement for Bristol and Providence, emphasizing the onboard musical entertainment

When first put into service, the owner of the Narragansett Steamship Company, Jim Fisk, would don an elaborate Admiral's uniform and greet every passenger boarding Bristol (or her sister ship Providence) at the gangway. Right on schedule, Fisk would give the order to sail, and the ship would put to sea "with the heavy load of passengers crowding her decks, music playing, flags flying, all her crew in uniform, each man having a badge on his cap showing his office and duty...". Fisk would remain on board until the ship pulled well out into the bay, at which time the vessel would stop and he would transfer to a pilot boat which would take him back to the city, after which Bristol would continue on her way.

This elaborate sailing ceremony was soon discontinued, and Fisk contented himself with remaining on shore to salute the ship in his Admiral's uniform as she put out to sea. Two of Fisk's other innovations however, were to have a more lasting impact. These were, firstly, the supply of uniforms to the crews of his ships, an unusual practice at the time, but one which had an agreeable impact on customers, and secondly, the employment of a band of musicians on each vessel to entertain passengers on their journey. Both of these innovations would thenceforth become traditions on Fall River Line steamers.

=== Collisions and other accidents ===
Over the course of her 21-year career, Bristol was involved in several collisions and other accidents, many of them occurring in conditions of heavy fog. The more significant of these are listed below.

In July 1869, Bristol collided with and sank a bark near Sands Point, New York. Fortunately the crew of the latter was rescued. In October of the same year, Bristol ran ashore on Bishop's Rock, off Coddington Point, Newport, remaining there for a day before being removed safely and without damage.

On 10 August 1872, Bristol ran into and sank the bark Bessie Rogers, which was at anchor outside the Torpedo Station on Goat Island, Rhode Island, in conditions of thick fog. Bessie Rogers was later salvaged and resumed service. Bristol was to run ashore in much the same area about eighteen months later, on April 12, 1874, but no damage was done and the ship was refloated three hours later with the assistance of the revenue cutter Samuel Dexter. Bristol ran ashore again in thick fog on the mud flats near Newport Harbor on June 14, 1877, remaining there until floated off by the rising tide about four hours later.

== Destruction ==
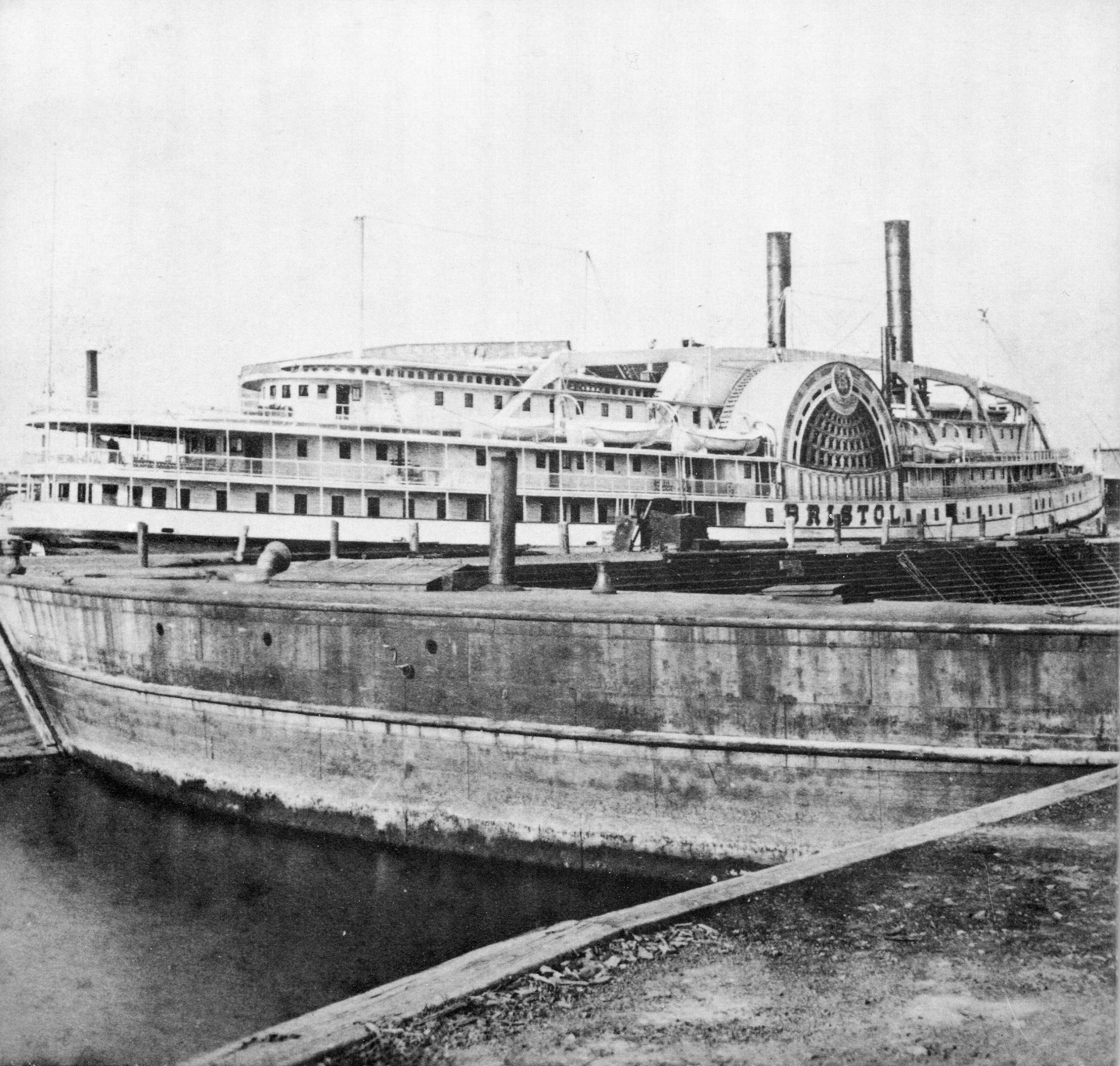
Stern view of Bristol dockside

Bristol departed New York on what was to become her final voyage on December 29, 1888, arriving at Newport Harbor around 3am on December 30.

Around 6am, people on the wharf noticed flames breaking through the ship's upper deck near the engine. The flames spread so quickly that the last passengers had difficulty leaving the ship. Firemen arrived but were unable to contain the flames. After several hours, most of the ship except the hull and paddle-boxes, which were too saturated with salt water to burn, had been destroyed, and the ship subsequently sank.

The remains of the vessel were raised on January 25, 1889, towed to the south dock and sold. In March a wrecking schooner removed the ship's machinery, after which the hull was presumably scrapped.
