= Charles H. Marshall (ship) =

Ship, launched 1869

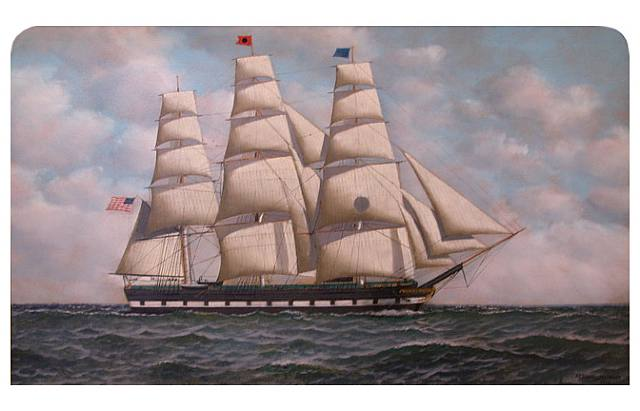
- Charles H. Marshall

History

United States
- Name: Charles H. Marshall
- Builder: William H. Webb, New York City
- Cost: $120,000
- Launched: May 26, 1869

History

Norway
- Name: Sovereign
- Acquired: 1887
- Fate: Burned while loading coal, 20 March 1891

General characteristics
- Class & type: Packet ship
- Tons burthen: 1683 or 2000 tons
- Length: 193 ft (59 m)
- Beam: 40 ft (12 m)
- Depth of hold: 28 ft 6 in (8.69 m)
- Notes: Signal letters J.G.Q.B

Charles H. Marshall was a 1683-ton packet ship built by William H. Webb in 1869. Charles H. Marshall was the last packet designed and built for the Black Ball Line. It was also the last packet, and the last full-rigged ship, built in New York.

== Construction ==
Charles H. Marshall was named after the Black Ball Line's founder. The ship was a "complete three decker" with a black hull with a narrow gold streak. Its official number in the Annual list of merchant vessels of the United States was 5728. Its signal letters were J.G.Q.B. Charles H. Marshall was the 135th ship built by William H. Webb, and he retired upon its completion.

== Voyages ==
Charles H. Marshall's nephew, Captain Charles A. Marshall (Captain C. A. Marshall), served as captain. Captain Marshall died of "congestion of the brain" during a 49-day passage from Liverpool to New York City in July 1872. Among the 400 passengers on board, there were four additional deaths, and one child born.

On August 29, 1872, Charles H. Marshall arrived in New York with 400 emigrant passengers, and several complaints of poor treatment were lodged against the crew. This was not the first time that charges of inhumane treatment were filed against the ship. The boatswain, John H. Morton was arrested by the Commissioners of Emigration, and charged with inhumane treatment of a passenger. The case was heard by United States Commissioner Osborne. Another contemporary author cited "outrageous conduct" in which the passengers, some of whom were Polish Jews, were " "robbed, beaten and starved." adding that "had the same assaults been committed on land, the perpetrators would surely have been consigned to the penitentiary."

A report from the Port Warden's Office, Halifax, Nova Scotia, dated 31 December 1886 describes assistance rendered to another vessel:

By agreement between the owners of the barque Prins Hendrik of Rotterdam, which vessel put into this port on 12th April in a leaky condition while bound from New York to Antwerp with a cargo of petroleum, and the underwriters of the cargo, the voyage was abandoned here. The cargo was forwarded to its destination by the ship Charles H Marshall of New York. The Prins Hendrik was properly repaired here and proceeded to Saint John, New Brunswick, where she loaded a cargo of deals.

== Fate ==
In 1887, the ship was sold to Norway as Sovereign and was destroyed by fire on 20 March 1891 while loading coal.
