= Swordfish (clipper) =

History

United States
- Name: Swordfish
- Owner: Barclays & Livingston
- Builder: William H. Webb
- Launched: 1851
- Fate: Wrecked at the mouth of Yangtze Kiang when her achors were fouled, July 1862 Wreck sold at auction, 26 July 1862

General characteristics
- Type: Extreme clipper
- Tonnage: 1,036 t (1,020 long tons; 1,142 short tons)
- Length: 169.6 ft (51.7 m)
- Beam: 36.6 ft (11.2 m)
- Draft: 20 ft (6.1 m)

Swordfish was an 1851 clipper ship which has been called William H. Webb’s masterpiece. She is known for her record-breaking race to San Francisco with the clipper Flying Fish.

== Record voyage ==
“On her first passage out to San Francisco a race was arranged for large stakes between her and the Flying-fish, a Boston record-breaker, built by the great designer, Donald McKay. The Sword-fish won, making the trip in ninety-two days,—the second best record ever made,—her rival taking ninety-eight days.”

The race took place in the fall the Sword Fish sailed out of Boston and the Flying Fish out of New York. The Flying Fish led to the equator by 4 days, but they both went round the Horn neck and neck. The Sword Fish would do the journey in 90 days, the Flying Fish in 98 1/2. The Flying Fish's career best record time to San Francisco was 92 days.
