= Providence (1866 steamboat) =

Large sidewheel steamer

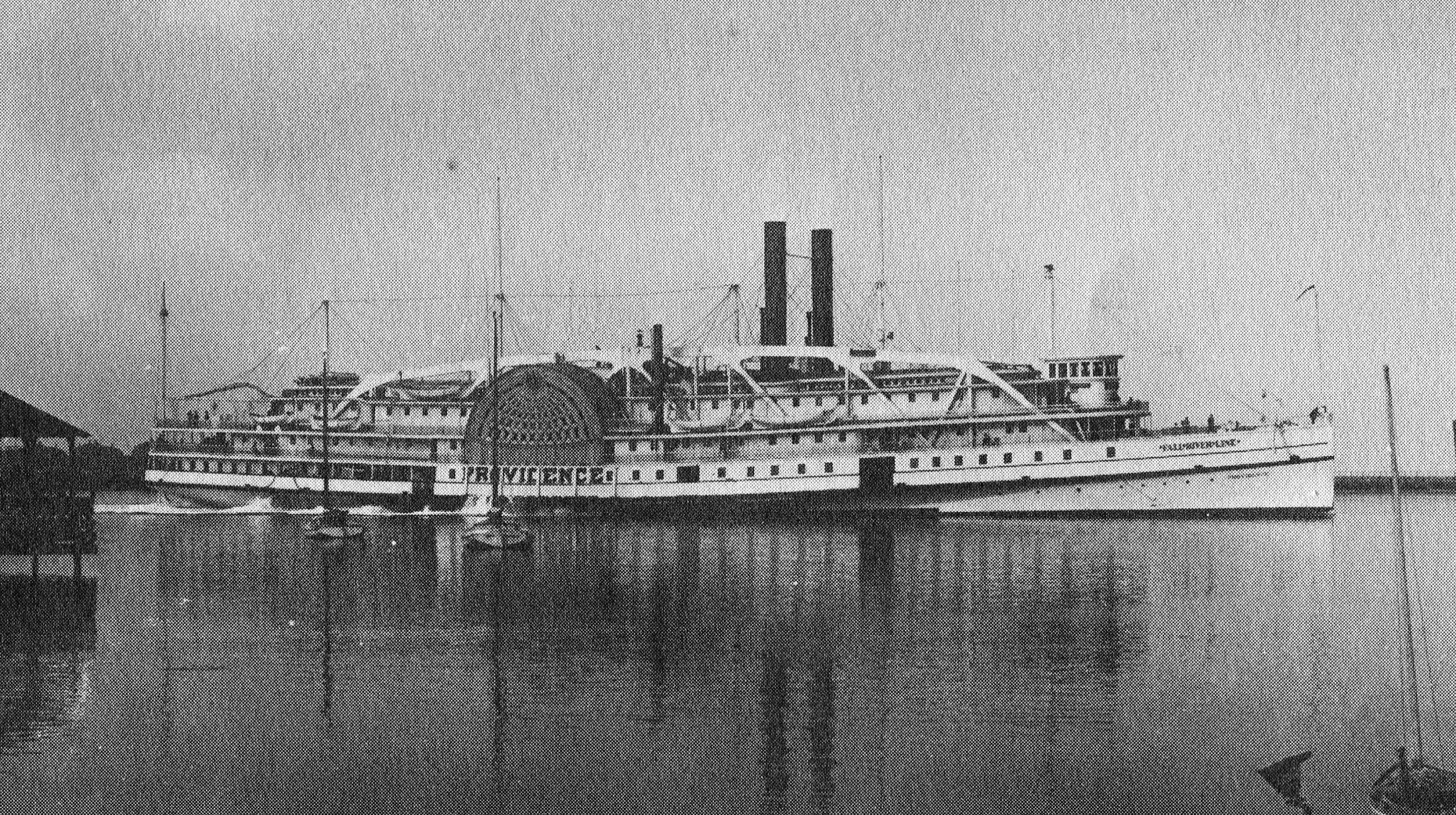
- Providence

History
- Name: Providence
- Namesake: Providence, Rhode Island
- Operator: Fall River Line
- Route: New York-Newport-Fall River
- Ordered: 1865
- Builder: William H. Webb
- Cost: $1,250,000
- Launched: June 28, 1866
- Completed: 1867
- Acquired: 1867
- Maiden voyage: June 1867
- In service: 1867-1896
- Fate: Scrapped, 1901

General characteristics
- Type: Passenger sidewheel steamer
- Tonnage: 2,962 gross, 2,064 net
- Length: 362 ft
- Beam: 48 ft 4 in, over guards 83 ft
- Draft: 10 ft 3 in
- Depth of hold: 16 ft 6 in
- Installed power: 1 x 110-inch-cylinder simple beam steam engine delivering 2,900 IHP @ 19 RPM, 3 x boilers
- Propulsion: 2 x 38 ft 8 in paddlewheels
- Capacity: 840 to 1,200 passengers plus 40 railcars of freight

Providence was a large sidewheel steamer launched in 1866 by William H. Webb of New York for the Merchants Steamship Company. The first of Narragansett Bay's so-called "floating palaces", the luxuriously outfitted Providence and her sister ship Bristol, each of which could carry up to 1,200 passengers, were installed with the largest engines then built in the United States, and were considered to be amongst the finest American-built vessels of their era.

Both ships would spend their entire careers steaming between New York and various destinations in and around Narragansett Bay, Rhode Island. Providence was eventually scrapped in 1901.

== Development ==
Providence and Bristol owed their existence to a short-lived company known as the Merchants Steamship Company, which placed the initial order for the vessels with the Webb shipyard in about 1865. Merchants Steamship was an amalgamation of three existing Narragansett Bay shipping lines, the Commercial Line, Neptune Line and Stonington Line. The Company intended to run the two steamers between New York and Bristol, Rhode Island in competition with the Fall River Line, which ran a similar service from New York to Fall River, Massachusetts (both Lines then linking up to railway lines that continued on to Boston).

== Construction ==
Providence and Bristol were both fitted with massive 110-inch-cylinder (9 foot 2 inch) walking beam engines, the largest engines ever fitted to American vessels up to that time – larger even than the 100-inch-cylinder engine for the mammoth ironclad USS Dunderberg built at the Webb shipyard around the same time. The engines, designed by Erasmus W. Smith, were supplied by the Etna Iron Works, which had only recently installed a lathe capable of boring such huge cylinders. The lathe itself was one of the two largest machine tools in the United States, the other being a planer installed by the same company.

Work on both Bristol and Providence was delayed by a long strike, but Bristol was eventually launched in April 1866, and Providence on July 28 of the same year. Between December 1865 and December 1866 however, the Merchants Steamship Company lost three of its existing ships, all of which were uninsured, thereby bankrupting the Company. Bristol and Providence remained in an uncompleted state at the shipyard until a new company, the Narragansett Steamship Company, which was partly owned by financier Jim Fisk, bought the new vessels in early 1867 and paid for their completion.

== Description ==
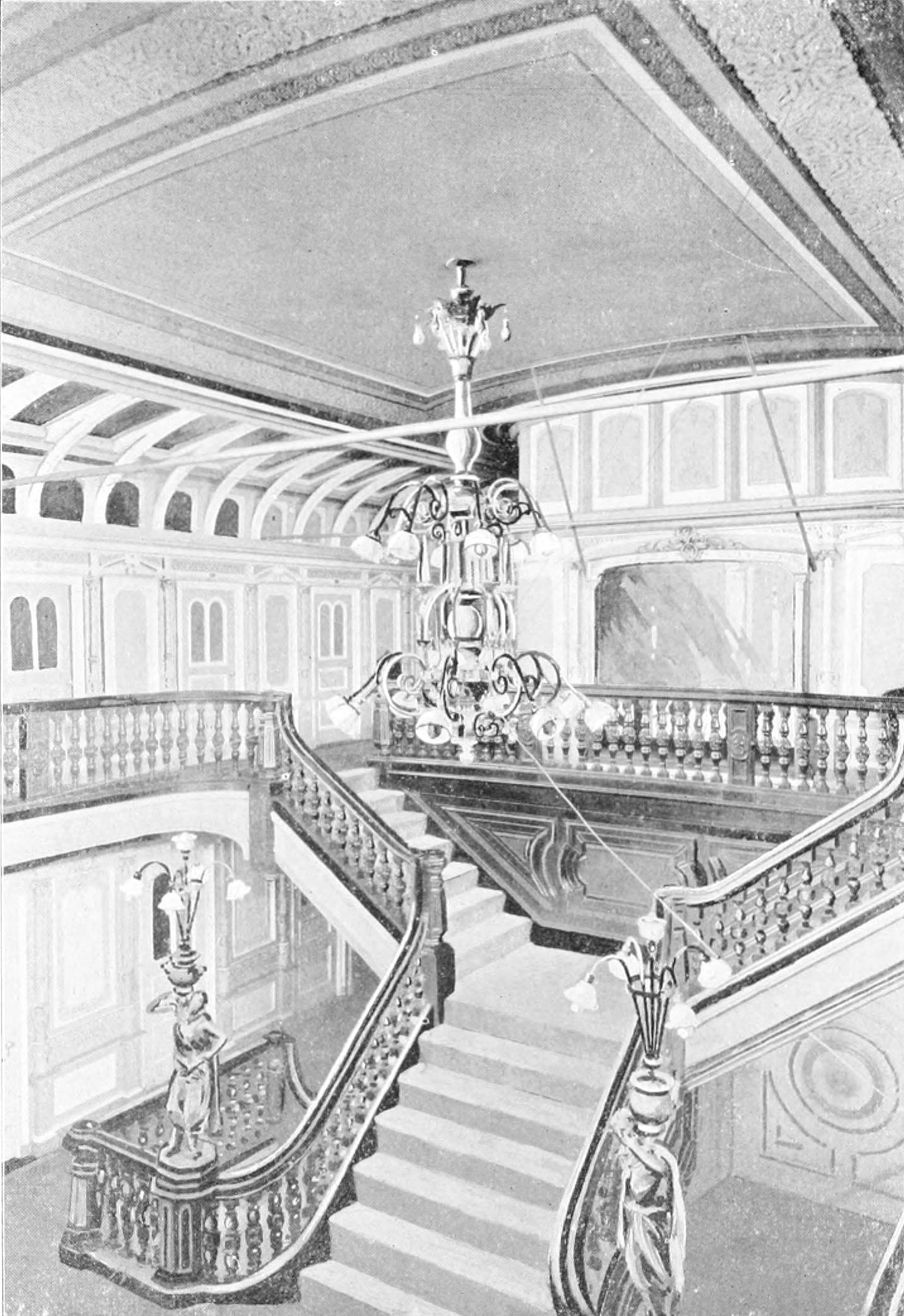
Interior of Providence, showing the main stairway and bulkhead in the rear saloon

When completed, Providence and Bristol were amongst the largest and most lavishly outfitted American vessels of their time. Each ship had 240 staterooms and over 300 berths, capable of accommodating 1,200 passengers, 840 of them in sleeping quarters. Their freight capacity was estimated at 40 railroad freight cars each. Their wooden hulls and paddle-boxes were strengthened with iron cross-bracings, while for safety they were installed with watertight compartments. The ships had gas lighting, and later on, steam heating and steam-powered steering. The decks, which were built of white oak, included an extra "gallery tier" deck from which passengers could view their surroundings.

Contemporary American observers gushed over the size and sophistication of the ships, lauding them as "world renowned mammoth palace steamers", "so far in advance of the type of steamboats heretofore built that they were looked upon as marvels" and "the finest specimens of marine architecture of their day." Bristol and Providence began a tradition of luxury travel on Narragansett Bay that would remain a popular attraction to travellers for the next fifty years. For a modest price, an ordinary working person could gain a glimpse of the opulent lifestyles of the wealthy just by taking a cruise on such a vessel.

== Service history ==
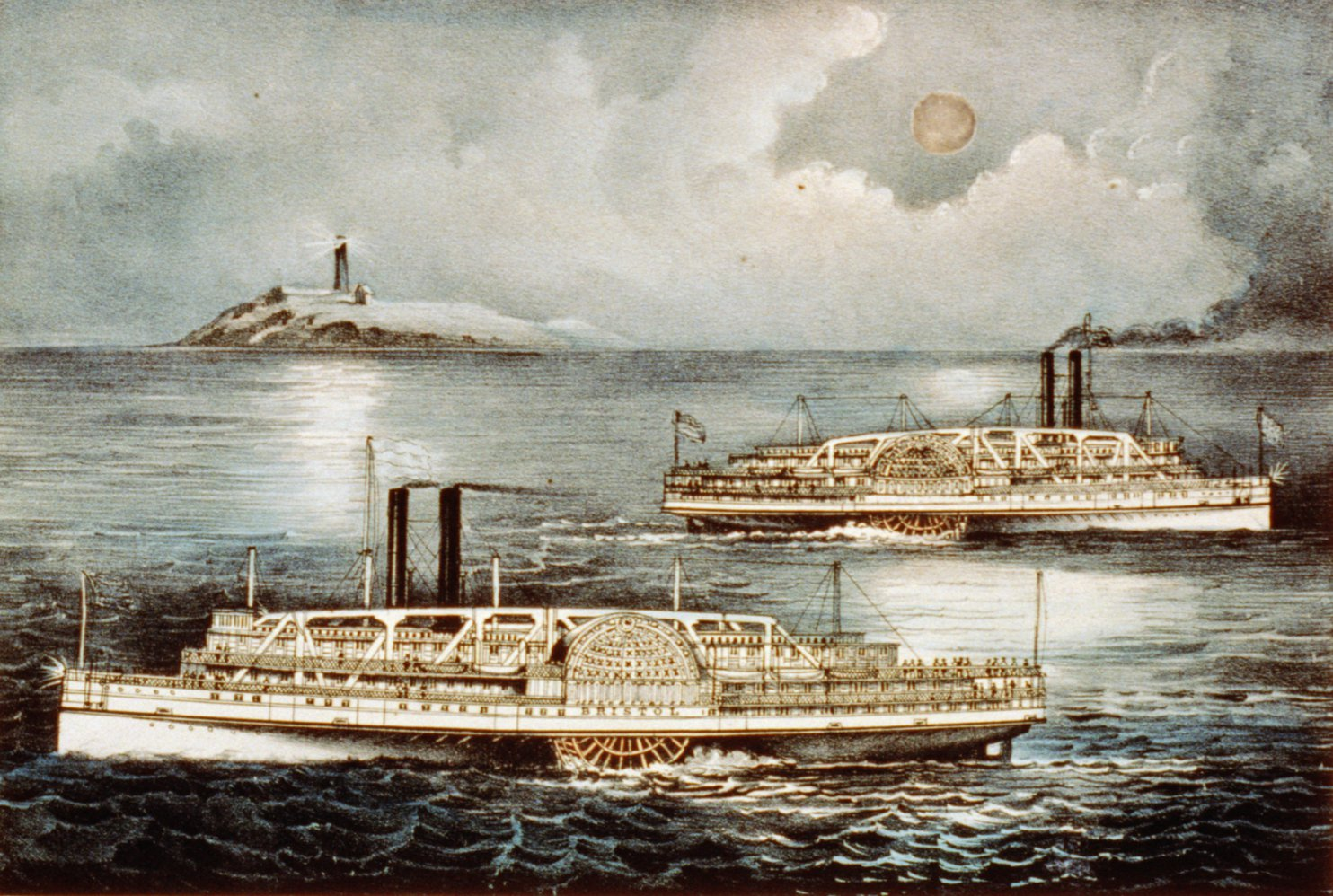
A lithograph of Providence passing her sister Bristol (foreground) at midnight on Long Island Sound

Providence made her maiden voyage in June 1867, and for the next two years was to maintain the run from New York to Bristol, Rhode Island, as part of the Narragansett Steamship Company's Bristol Line. In 1869, the Narragansett Steamship Company merged with the Boston, Newport and New York Steamboat Company, and Providence and her sister ship Bristol thus joined the latter Company's Fall River Line. The two vessels began running from New York to Fall River, Massachusetts, with a stop at Newport, Rhode Island, while the service to Bristol was discontinued. Providence would subsequently maintain the New York-Fall River route to the end of her career.

=== Customer service innovations ===
In the first weeks of Providence's service, Company President Jim Fisk would dress in an elegant "Admiral's" uniform to personally welcome aboard passengers, a practice which was soon discontinued. Two further innovations however were to prove more permanent. Fisk fitted his ship's crews with uniforms, which had an agreeable impact on customers, and he also employed a band of musicians on each vessel to entertain passengers on their journey, both innovations which would henceforth become traditions on Fall River Line steamers.

=== President Grant's "Peace Jubilee" voyage ===
In 1869, a "Peace Jubilee" was held in Boston, and U.S. President Ulysses S. Grant was invited to attend. After travelling to New York, the best accommodations of Providence were put at Grant's disposal for the next leg of his journey, which he accepted.

Fisk hosted Grant on the voyage, while a number of other business leaders, including financier Jay Gould, also took passage in hopes of making Grant's acquaintance. Fisk went on to accompany Grant to the Boston Jubilee, and dressed once again in his flamboyant admiral's uniform, managed to upstage the U.S. President upon their entry together, from which he was to earn the nickname "Jubilee Jim".

=== Collisions and other accidents ===
Over the course of her 29-year career, Providence was involved in several collisions and other accidents. The more significant of these are listed below.

On September 10, 1875, one of Providence's paddleboxes was damaged in a heavy storm off Point Judith, and the ship was forced to turn around and return slowly to Newport for repairs. On September 28, 1877, a schooner accidentally rammed Providence, the bowsprit penetrating through two staterooms to the inner saloon, but fortunately no-one was injured. On October 19, 1880, off Watch Hill, the port shaft of the eastbound Providence broke. A small propeller steamer named Albatross initially attempted a tow, but the larger City of Fitchburg then arrived on the scene and towed the stricken Providence back to Newport. Mechanical repairs took about two weeks.

Providence's most serious accident occurred on June 22, 1887. At high tide, the steamer ran into the sand spit southeast of Hog Island, and could not be refloated for several weeks. The hull suffered considerable damage, requiring extended repairs, and the steamer City of Worcester (1881) was chartered to operate in her place while the repairs were effected. The following year, Providence was involved in another serious accident when she ran into and sank the steam yacht Adelaide.

=== Final years ===
Providence was retired from regular service after the introduction of two new iron-hulled steamers, Puritan (1889) and Plymouth (1890), but was still used on occasion until Priscilla was added to the Fall River Line's fleet in 1894. Thereafter, Providence was only used when there were no other alternatives. Her last commercial voyages are believed to have occurred between December 1895 and early 1896, when she was called upon to operate for a few days when some of the regular steamers were temporarily out of commission.

Providence's last years were spent tied up at Briggs Wharf, Newport. In the autumn of 1901, the vessel was sold for scrap and towed to Boston for dismantling. After the removal of her furnishings and machinery, Providence suffered the typical fate of wooden steamers of her time by being hauled onto a beach and burned in order to recover the remaining brass, copper, and other metal fittings.
