= USS Ammonoosuc =

USS Ammonoosuc may refer to:

- USS Ammonoosuc (1864)
- USS Ammonoosuc, the original name for USS Bagaduce (AT-21)
