= William H. Webb =

American shipbuilder (1816–1899)

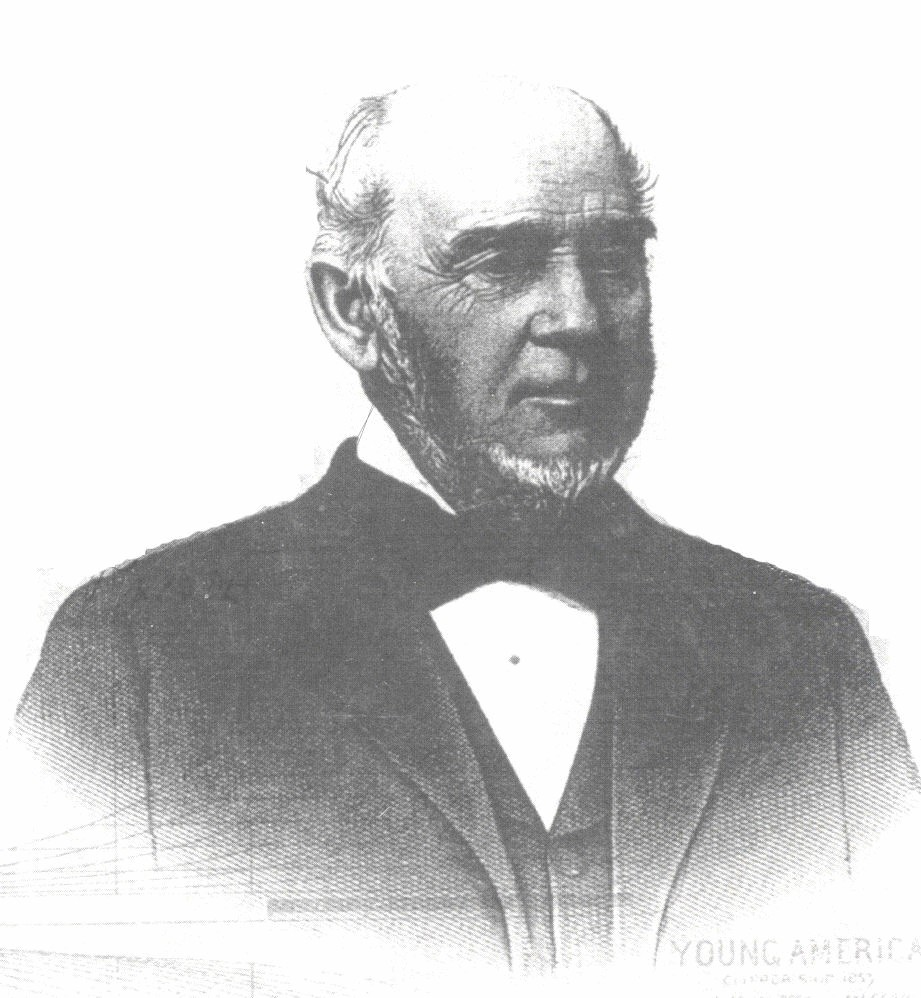
- Born: June 19, 1816; New York City
- Died: October 30, 1899 (aged 83); New York City
- Resting place: Woodlawn Cemetery, New York City
- Occupation: Shipbuilder
- Years active: Shipbuilding 1831–1869; Finance, philanthropy 1869–1899
- Spouse: Henrietta Amelia Hidden
- Children: 7

William Henry Webb (June 19, 1816 – October 30, 1899) was a 19th-century New York City shipbuilder and philanthropist, who has been called America's first true naval architect.

== Early life ==
William Henry Webb was born in New York on June 19, 1816. His father Isaac trained at the shipyard of New York shipbuilder Henry Eckford before opening his own shipyard, Isaac Webb & Co., near Corlears Hook in about 1818, later relocating to Stanton Street. Isaac eventually took on a partner and the firm was renamed Webb & Allen.

William was educated privately and at Columbia College Grammar School, demonstrating a natural aptitude for mathematics. He built his first boat, a small skiff, at the age of twelve, and in spite of his parents' wishes to the contrary, secured an apprenticeship at his father's shipyard at the age of fifteen. At twenty, he was awarded a subcontract for the New York-Liverpool packet ship Oxford, his first commercial contract.

== Career ==
After completing his six-year apprenticeship, William decided to further his education by travelling to Scotland in 1840 to visit the famous shipyards of the Clyde. During this journey, however, his father Isaac died suddenly at the age of 46, and 23-year-old William returned home to assume management of the shipyard.

Upon examining the accounts, William discovered that his father's business was technically insolvent, and thus one of his first duties was to settle his father's debts. Having done so, he set about reinvigorating the business.

Webb inherited his father's shipyard, Webb & Allen, in 1840, renamed it William H. Webb, and turned it into America's most prolific shipyard, building 133 vessels between 1840 and 1865. Webb designed some of the fastest and most successful sailing packets and clipper ships ever built, and he also built some of the largest and most celebrated steamboats and steamships of his era, including the giant ironclad USS Dunderberg, in its day the world's longest wooden-hulled ship.

After the American Civil War, the U.S. shipbuilding industry experienced a prolonged slump, and Webb, having already made a considerable fortune, decided to close his shipyard and turn his energies toward philanthropic goals. He chaired an anti-corruption council, became a founding member of the Society of Naval Architects and Marine Engineers, and established the Webb Academy and Home for Shipbuilders, which today is known as the Webb Institute.

== William H. Webb shipyard ==
In later years, Webb would sometimes be asked to what he attributed his reputation and success, to which he would typically reply "attention to detail". Born into an era when shipbuilding was considered as much an art as a science, Webb, a "born mathematician", brought new levels of professionalism to the craft through his combining of the art of design with the discipline of careful mathematical calculation. For this reason, he has been described as America's first true naval architect.

He was content to start small, however. For the first couple of years at the helm, the Webb & Allen shipyard, now located between Fifth and Seventh Streets on the East River, built a variety of mostly small sailing ships, including ferries, sloops and schooners. William bought out his father's old partner John Allen in 1843 and subsequently renamed the business William H. Webb.

=== Clippers and packets ===
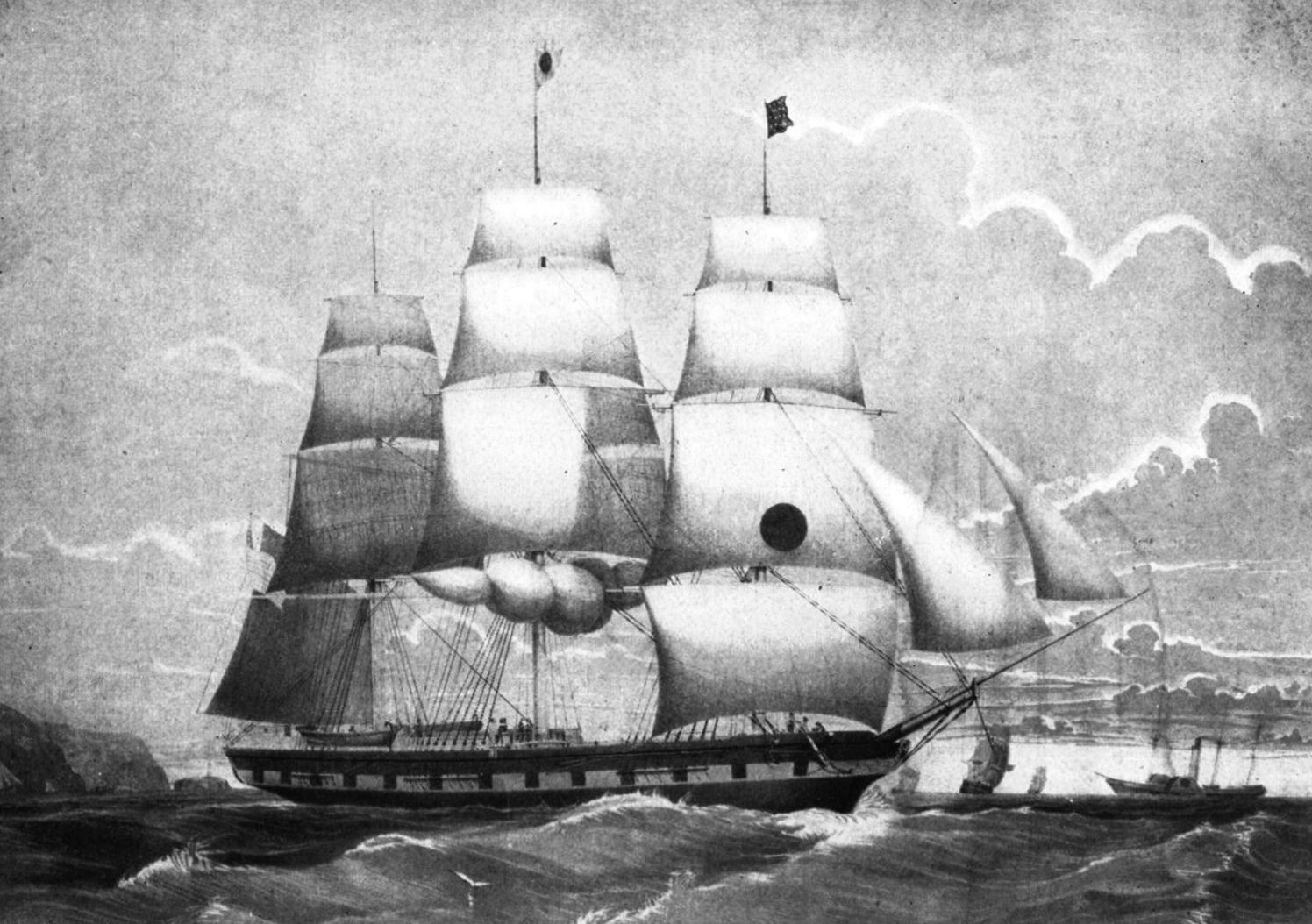
Montezuma, 1843 packet ship

Webb soon began turning out larger and more ambitious vessels, including several sailing packets and clipper ships, types for which the yard would soon become famous. The 900-ton packets Montezuma and Yorkshire were built in 1843, along with the pre-clipper Cohota.

By 1849, Webb's shipyard was at the cutting edge of sailing ship design. In that year, he built the packet ships Albert Gallatin and Guy Mannering. At 1435 and 1419 tons respectively, these ships were at time of completion the two largest merchant vessels in the world. Another packet built by Webb was Harvest Queen.

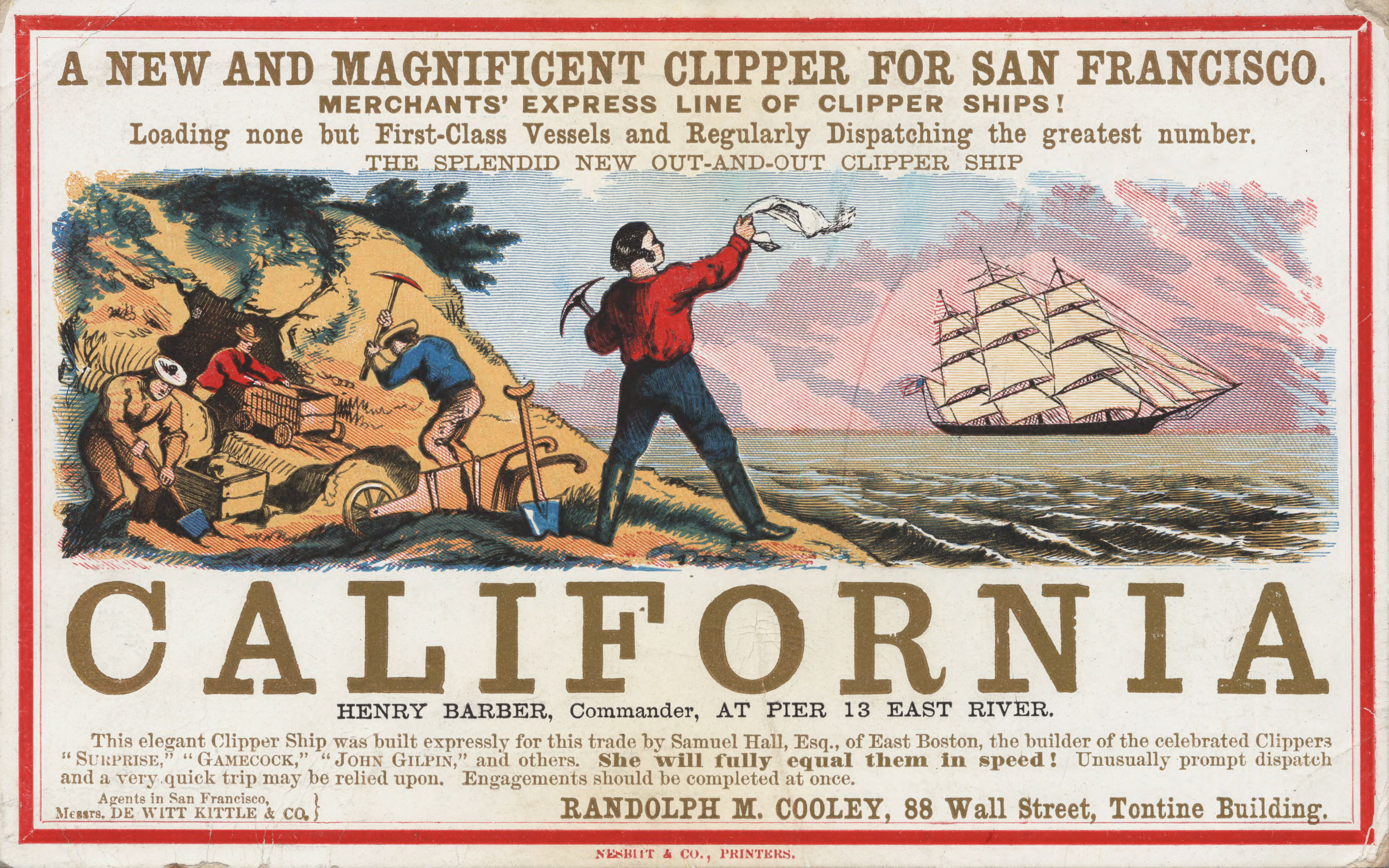
Clipper ships were in great demand during the California gold rush

The California gold rush was by then in full swing, bringing with it strong demand for new ships to convey prospectors and supplies to and from the goldfields. Clipper ships were seen as ideal for the trade, and in 1851, Webb built a number of them, including Gazelle, Challenge, Comet, Invincible and Swordfish. Comet and Swordfish, 1,836 and 1,036 tons respectively, were both to set sailing speed records. The Comet was represented by a half-model. The lines and sail plan are in the William H. Webb's Plans Of Wooden Ships.

Freight rates to the goldfields had by this time skyrocketed to such an extent that a ship could pay for its construction with a single voyage.

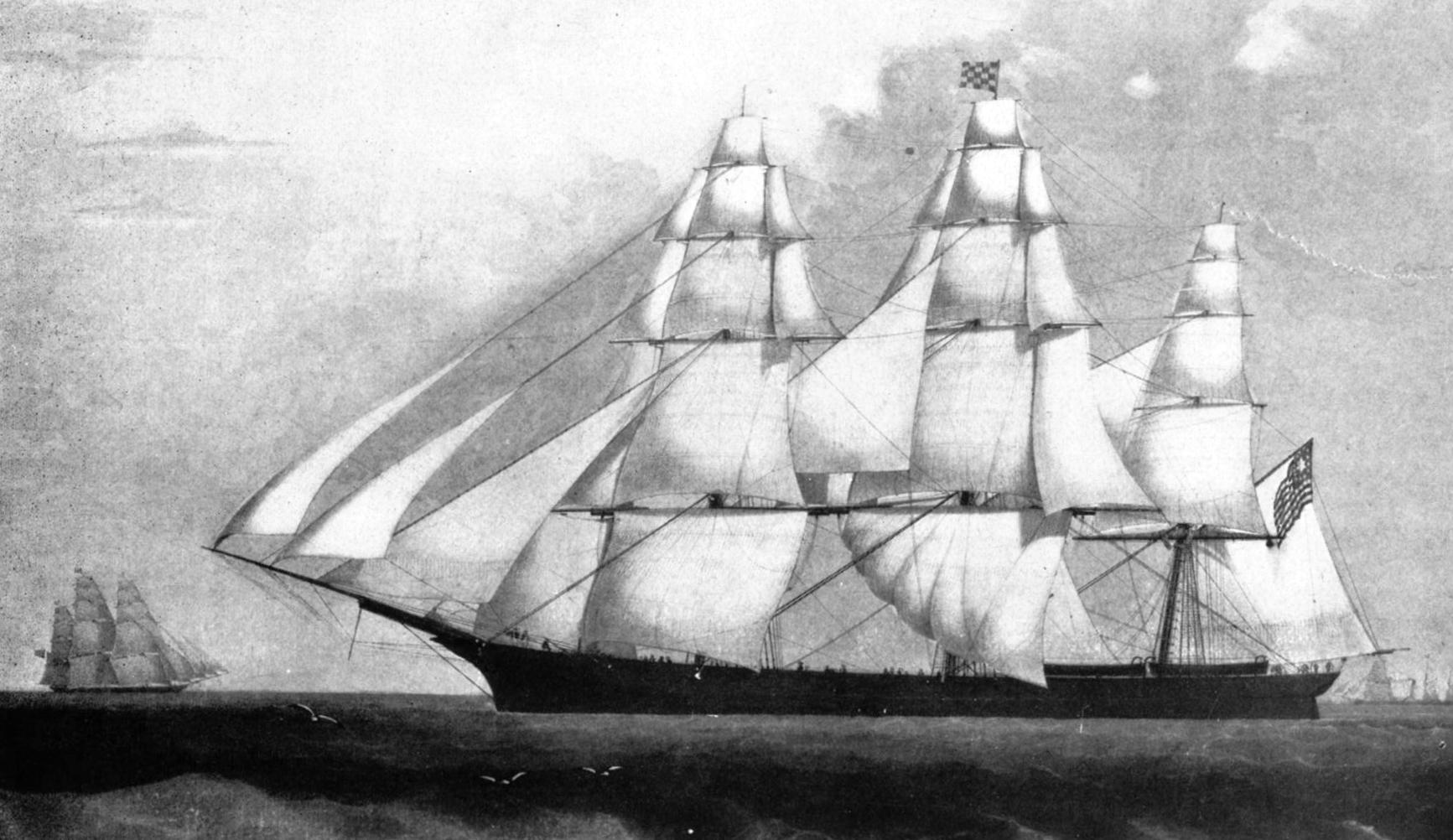
Challenge, 1851 clipper

Webb's clipper designs "employed the most judicious use of timber of all the major shipbuilders." For the Challenge, Webb relied on the hull planking as an integral part of the ship's structural strength, and increased the width between frames at the bow and stern of the ship, thus using four fewer frames for a 200 ft. hull, saving about 25,000 lbs.

In 1853, Webb built the 1,961-ton clipper Young America, considered by many to be the most beautiful clipper ship ever built, the "acme of perfection" in clipper design. In 1855, he built the 1,406-ton packet ship, the Neptune for the Black Ball Line. In 1856, he built the 2,145-ton packet ship Ocean Monarch, the largest sailing ship ever constructed at a New York shipyard.

=== Steamboats and steamships ===
Though renowned for the beauty and speed of his packets and clippers, Webb nevertheless built many steamboats and steamships through the course of his career.

Notable steamships built by the Webb shipyard include the 1,857-ton sidewheel steamer United States (1846), which became the first steamship to operate in the New Orleans trade; the 1,450-ton steamer Cherokee (1848), the first steamship to operate between New York and Savannah, Georgia; the Isaac Webb (1850), a 1,500-ton ship that was in the Liverpool packet line; the California, the first steamer to enter the Golden Gate; and the first steamers built for the Pacific Mail Steamship Company. In the postbellum era, he also built the "floating palaces" Bristol and Providence (see below).

=== Warships ===
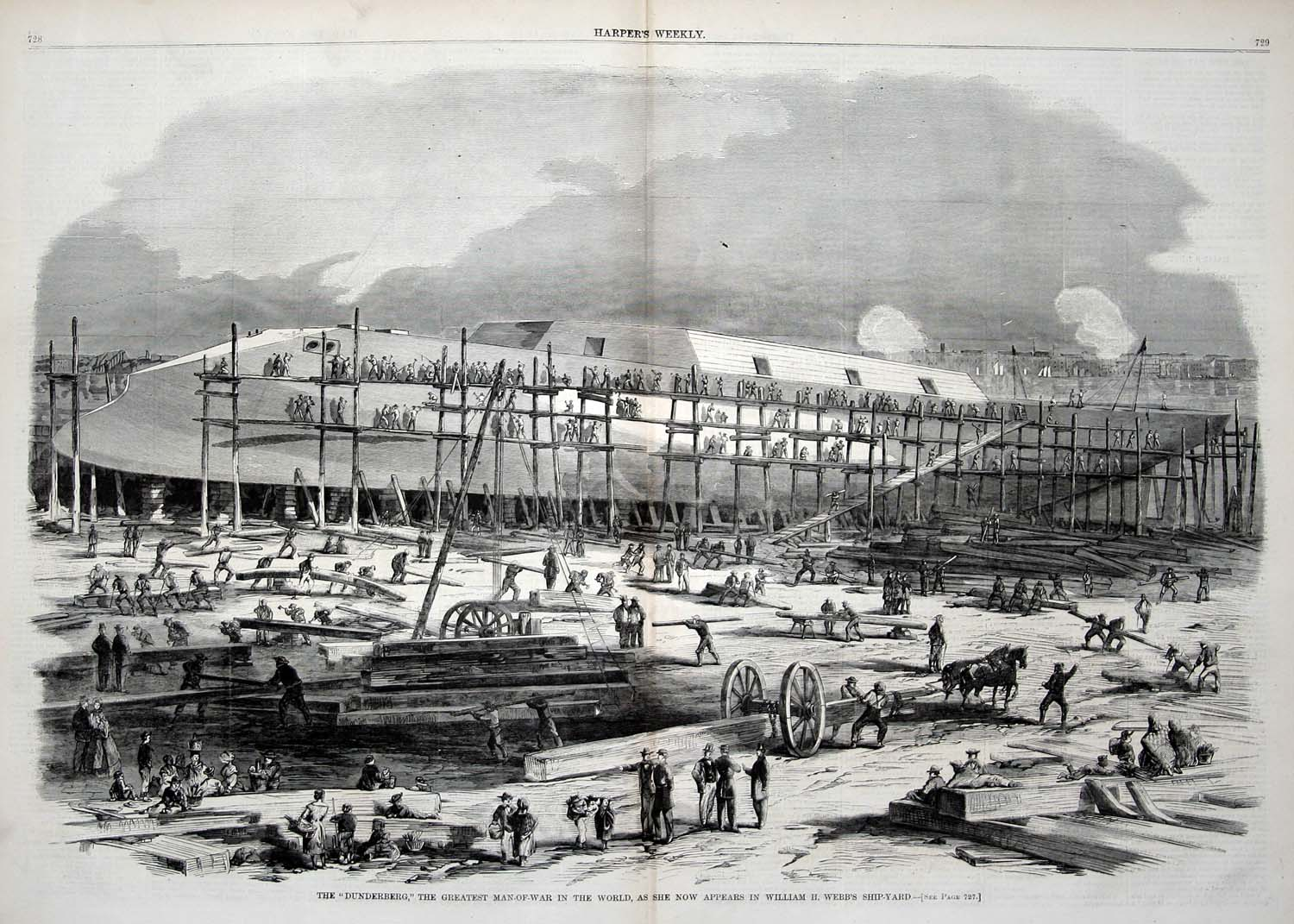
USS Dunderberg under construction at the Webb shipyard, 1863

By 1855, the gold rush was over, and Webb began looking for new markets to keep his yard busy. In 1859, he completed the steam frigate General Admiral for the Imperial Russian government—the fastest steam frigate then afloat. In 1860 he contracted with the Italian government for the construction of two ironclads, Re d'Italia and Re Don Luigi di Portogallo, but because of the outbreak of the American Civil War, these vessels were not completed until 1863 and 1864 respectively. Both vessels were to participate in the Battle of Lissa between Italy and Austria in 1866.

The most impressive warship built by the Webb shipyard, however, was the giant ironclad USS Dunderberg. The vessel was not completed until shortly after the Civil War, but when launched was the longest wooden-hulled ship ever built, a record it held for many years.

=== Postwar slump and closure ===
After the end of the Civil War in 1865, the U.S. government auctioned off the hundreds of ships it had requisitioned during the war at firesale prices, depressing the market and leaving American shipyards with no work. The result was that most American shipyards, along with marine engine specialists, went to the wall. The shipbuilding industry in New York was particularly badly affected by the slump, being practically wiped out in the ensuing years.

Webb's shipyard suffered like all the rest. In 1867, the yard added one last distinction to its record with the completion of the twin sidewheel steamers Bristol and Providence—two of the largest and most lavish steamers of their era, which were to set new standards of comfort and luxury on Narragansett Bay. After this however, Webb was able to secure only two further contracts over the next two years.

The last ship built by William H. Webb was the steamship Charles H. Marshall, fittingly named after Webb's most longstanding customer, who had awarded Webb his first subcontract as an apprentice more than thirty years earlier. Webb, who by this time had concluded that iron-hulled ships were the industry's future, closed his yard permanently in 1869. The yard had built 133 ships between 1840 and 1865—more than any other American shipyard over the same period—135 ships in total.

== Later career ==
Though Webb's shipbuilding career had come to an end, he was still only 53 years of age and had accumulated a large fortune. He now began to try his hand as a financier, helping to organize a successful South American guano company, and attempting less successfully to profit from a shipping line to Nicaragua, the Central American Transit Company. He also made considerable investments in real estate, one result of which was the construction of a Hotel, the Bristol, at 42nd Street and Fifth Avenue.

Increasingly however he turned his hand to philanthropy. He took an interest in public affairs in his home city of New York, but eschewed the role of politician, turning down an offer of the Mayoralty on no less than three occasions. Instead, he accepted the role of Chairman of the New York City Council on Political Reform, an organization formed to combat political corruption. One of his most important achievements in this regard concerned his opposition to the Aqueduct Commission, by which he helped secure a safe and reliable water system for New Yorkers, which is still in operation today.

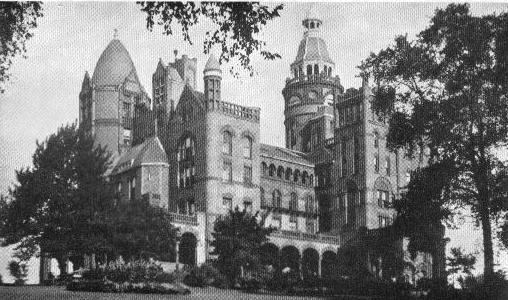
The original Webb Academy and Home for Shipbuilders

In 1894 he built the Webb Academy and Home for Shipbuilders, in the Fordham section of the Bronx (now the site of Fordham Hill Apartments) and provided an endowment for its running estimated at $2,000,000. The main purpose of the Academy was in the words of its charter to "furnish gratuitous education in the art, science and profession of shipbuilding". Tuition for the students, who were carefully selected on the basis of aptitude and lack of means, was free. The facility also provided a free home to old shipbuilders, including a number of Webb's own former employees. By 1899 the Academy was providing facilities to about 400 students and retirees. The Academy is known today as the Webb Institute.

Webb was also a founding member of the Society of Naval Architects and Marine Engineers, and was the first to sign his name on its charter. The organization today has branches worldwide. In addition, Webb was a member of the New York Chamber of Commerce, the Union League, the Republican Club, National Academy of Design, Metropolitan Museum of Art, American Museum of Natural History, American Geographical Society, and the New England Society.

== Death ==
William H. Webb died suddenly at his home, 415 Fifth Avenue, on October 30, 1899. He was survived by a son, William E. Webb. Another son, Marshall, had died the previous year. Webb is buried in Woodlawn Cemetery in the Bronx.

Webb was inducted into the National Sailing Hall of Fame in 2018.

== Publications ==
- Plans of Wooden Vessels Selected as Types from one hundred and fifty of various kinds and descriptions, from a fishing smack to the largest clipper ships and vessels of war, both sail and steam, built by Wm. H. Webb, in the city of New York, from the year 1840 to the year 1869; 2 volumes. Volume 1, [available online]
- William H. Webb Collection 1895 The William H. Webb collection consists of a selection of folio plates removed from a copy of the book "Wooden Vessels built by William H. Webb in the City of New York, 1840-1869".
