= USS Dunderberg =

Ironclad ship

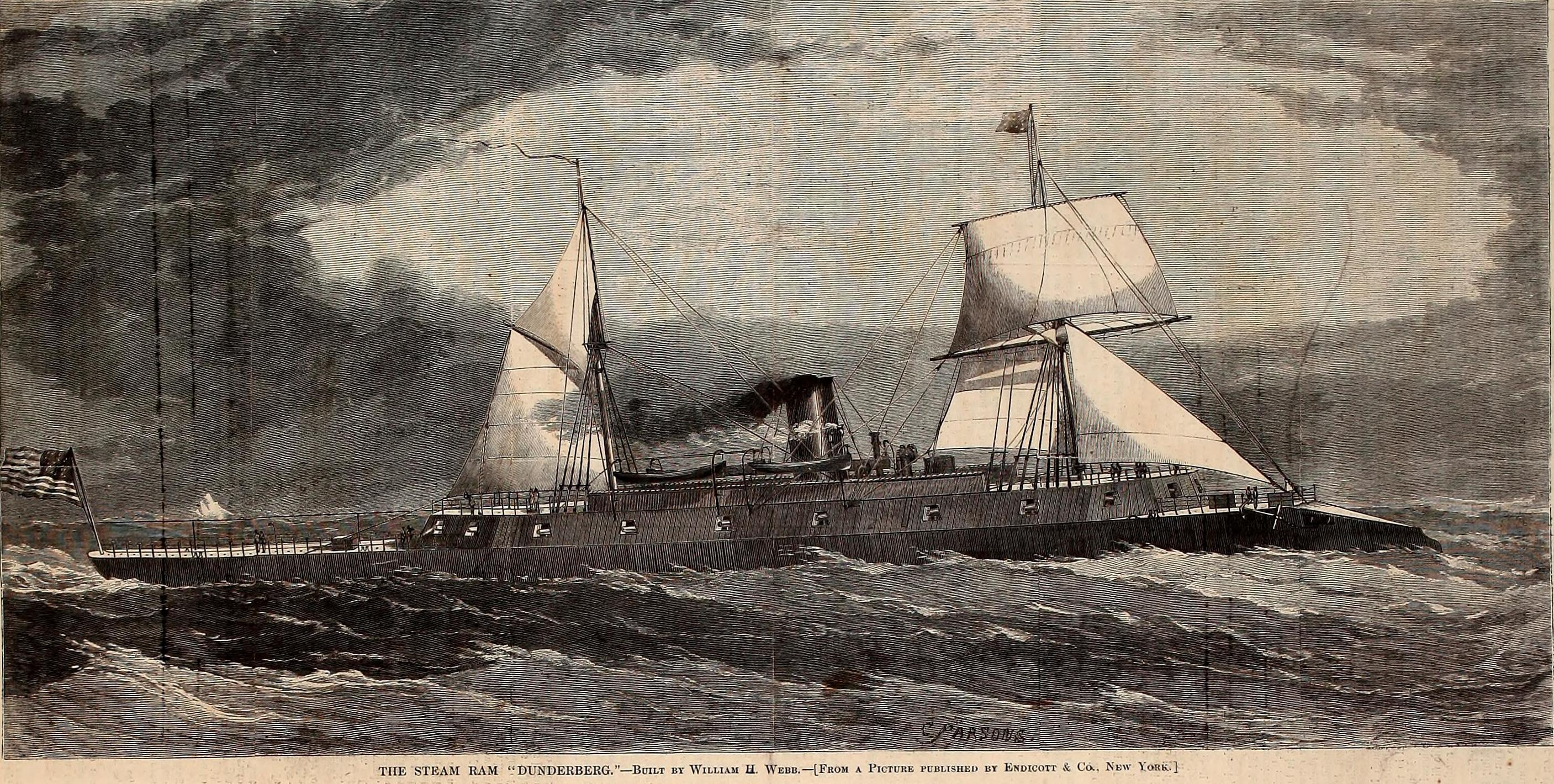
- The steam ram Dunderberg, Harper's Weekly, 1867

History

United States
- Name: Dunderberg
- Namesake: Swedish: "thunder(ing) mountain"
- Ordered: 3 July 1862
- Builder: William H. Webb, New York City
- Laid down: by 3 October 1862
- Launched: 22 July 1865
- Fate: Not accepted by U.S.N. Sold to France by 7 May 1867

France
- Name: Rochambeau
- Namesake: Comte de Rochambeau
- Acquired: by 7 May 1867
- Commissioned: 7 August 1867
- Renamed: 7 August 1867
- Stricken: 15 April 1872
- Fate: Scrapped, 1874

General characteristics (in French service, 1868)
- Type: Casemate ironclad
- Displacement: 7,849 metric tons (7,725 long tons)
- Length: 107.4 m (352 ft 4 in) (p/p)
- Beam: 22.15 m (72 ft 8 in)
- Draft: 6.5 m (21 ft 4 in) (mean)
- Depth: 7.078 m (23 ft 2.7 in)
- Installed power: 4,000 PS (2,900 kW); 6 Tubular boilers
- Propulsion: 1 shaft, 2 Horizontal back-acting steam engines
- Sail plan: Brigantine rig
- Speed: 14.5 knots (26.9 km/h; 16.7 mph)
- Range: 2,200 kilometres (1,200 nmi) at 8 knots (15 km/h; 9.2 mph)
- Complement: 600
- Armament: 4 × 1 – 274 mm (10.8 in) Mle 1864/66 guns; 10 × 1 – Canon de 24 C modèle 1864 (9.4 in) guns
- Armor: Waterline belt: 90–70 mm (3.5–2.8 in); Deck: 18 mm (0.7 in); Casemate: 120 mm (4.7 in); Conning tower: 250 mm (9.8 in)

Dunderberg, which is a Swedish word meaning "thunder(ing) mountain", was an ocean-going casemate ironclad of 14 guns built for the Union Navy. She resembled an enlarged, two-masted version of the Confederate casemate ironclad CSS Virginia. She was originally designed to have both gun turrets and a casemate but the turrets were deleted while the ship was still being built. Construction began in 1862, but progress was slow and she was not launched until after the end of the American Civil War in 1865.

The ship was not accepted by the Union Navy so her builder began seeking buyers elsewhere; Otto von Bismarck expressed some interest, and the thought of Prussia armed with such a vessel prompted France to purchase her and commission her in 1867 with the name Rochambeau. She was initially placed in reserve, but was mobilized in 1870 to participate in the Franco-Prussian War. The ship saw no action and was decommissioned after the end of the war. Rochambeau was stricken from the Navy Directory in 1872 and scrapped in 1874.

== Design, description and construction ==
On 11 April 1862, William H. Webb, arguably the premier wooden shipbuilder in the country, sent a model of a large wooden-hulled, casemate ironclad with a displacement of about 7,000 long tons (7,100 t) to the US Navy Department. Webb signed a contract on 3 July with the Navy's Bureau of Yards and Docks for a ship that had an overall length of 350 feet (106.7 m), a beam of at least 68 feet (20.7 m) and a draft of no more than 20 feet 6 inches (6.2 m). His ship was required to make 15 knots (28 km/h; 17 mph) in still water and she was to be armed with four 15-inch (381 mm) Dahlgren guns in two gun turrets, each protected by 11 inches (279 mm) of armor, and eight 11-inch Dahlgren guns in a casemate. The ship was to be completed in 15 months at a cost of $1,250,000.

Now named Dunderberg by Webb, the contract was amended on 27 August to specify her armor scheme. Above the main deck, her armor was to be 4.5 inches (114 mm) thick. From the main deck to a depth of 5 feet (1.5 m) below the waterline, the armor was to be 3.5 inches (89 mm) thick, tapering to 2.5 inches (64 mm) at its lower edge. The ship's main and casemate deck armor was .75 inches (19 mm) thick except at the rear of the ship. (Note: The rationale for the thicker aft deck armor is not given, but it appears to be intended to protect the machinery spaces that were vulnerable to a plunging shell fired from the rear.) The main deck, from the rear of the casemate to the stern, was to consist of 4.5-inch armor plates that tapered to 2.5 inches in thickness. Dunderberg was to be given a complete double bottom and her engine and boiler rooms were to be completely enclosed by watertight bulkheads. She was also to be provided with two masts and the appropriate rigging.

The ship was powered by two back-acting steam engines driving one four-bladed propeller 21 feet (6.4 m) feet in diameter, using steam generated by six tubular boilers at a working pressure of 25 psi (172 kPa; 2 kgf/cm^{2}). The engines, designed to produce 4,500 indicated horsepower (3,400 kW), and boilers were both subcontracted by Webb to the Etna Iron Works of New York City. The engines were originally intended to have a bore of 90 inches (2,286 mm) and a stroke of 45 inches (1,143 mm), but Webb increased the bore to 100 inches (2,540 mm) to insure that Dunderberg reached her contract speed. During the ship's first sea trial on 22 February 1867, she reached a speed of about 12.5 knots (23.2 km/h; 14.4 mph); during a demonstration for her French buyers on 12 June, Dunderberg reached 13.9 knots (25.7 km/h; 16.0 mph). She had two auxiliary boilers to provide steam for the steam engines that powered her pumps, ventilation fans and rotated the gun turrets. These engines, with their bore and stroke of 36 inches (914 mm), were larger than the main engines of the Passaic-class monitors. All of the boilers exhausted through a retractable funnel. The ship normally carried 540 long tons (550 t) of coal, but could hold a maximum of 1,000 long tons (1,000 t). She had a light brigantine rig that had a sail area of 11,170 square feet (1,038 m^{2}).

Her keel was laid down before 3 October 1862 at Webb's shipyard in New York City, (Note: The exact date is not known, but references in Webb's letters place it between 23 September and 3 October.) even though Webb was forced to use unseasoned oak for Dunderberg because the supply of seasoned timber had been exhausted earlier in the war. Unseasoned wood was far more prone to rot and significantly shortened the ship's life. Her hull was very strongly built with the space between her frames filled with timber and diagonal iron straps tied her frames together. The sides of the casemate at the level of the main deck were approximately 5 feet (1.5 m) thick. Before beginning construction, Webb redesigned the hull, increasing its length to 358 feet 8 inches (109.3 m) between perpendiculars and its overall length to 377 feet 4 inches (115.0 m). Her beam decreased from 75 feet 6 inches (23.0 m) to 72 feet 10 inches (22.2 m) and she displaced, at her nominal draft of 18 feet (5.5 m) forward and 21 feet (6.4 m) aft, 6,948 long tons (7,059 t). These changes made her the longest wooden ship ever built. Dunderberg's hull was protected from biofouling by two external layers of zinc and copper. The ship was fitted with two rudders, the primary one in the usual location aft of the propeller, but she also had an auxiliary rudder placed in the deadwood above and ahead of the propeller.

Many other changes were made to Dunderberg while she was under construction and significantly contributed to her delays in completion. The most important of these was the eventual elimination of her turrets which began in October 1863 when Webb wrote to Gideon Welles, Secretary of the Navy, saying that he concurred with the General Superintendent of Ironclads, Rear Admiral Francis Gregory's suggestion that the "turrets be dispensed with and the casemate lengthened to accommodate an additional number of guns" Welles did not approve the change until September 1864 when he authorized an armament of four 15-inch and twelve 11-inch guns in the casemate. This was extended by 73 feet (22.3 m) to an approximate overall length of 228 feet (69.5 m) so that it now covered the aft magazine and shell room. It was provided with a total of 22 gun ports, six on each broadside, two on each corner and one each facing the bow and stern. The design of the gun ports was another issue that took years to resolve. They were originally sized for the 11-inch Dahlgren gun with a height of 42 inches (1,067 mm), but this was inadequate to allow the guns to fully elevate as experience with New Ironsides proved. The mounting of the much larger 15-inch Dahlgren gun in the casemate further complicated the design of the gun ports, especially since the design for their carriages was not even finished until May 1866. The design of the gunport itself was revised in the second half of 1865 to reduce the chance of projectiles entering them; the new design was roughly hourglass shaped and narrower in the middle of the casemate than on either the inside or the outside of the gun port. All of these changes to the gun ports delayed the completion of the casemate's woodwork as well as the cutting and installation of the casemate armor. The angle of the casemate was also changed from the original very shallow 35° from the horizontal to an angle of 60° after Rear Admiral Joseph Smith, Chief of the Bureau of Yards and Docks, noted that it would be very difficult to work the guns at such an angle. The deletion of the turrets also required a redesign of the conning tower as Webb had intended to mount it on top of the fore turret. A copy of that used by the Miantonomoh-class monitors was installed between the funnel and the foremast during August 1866.

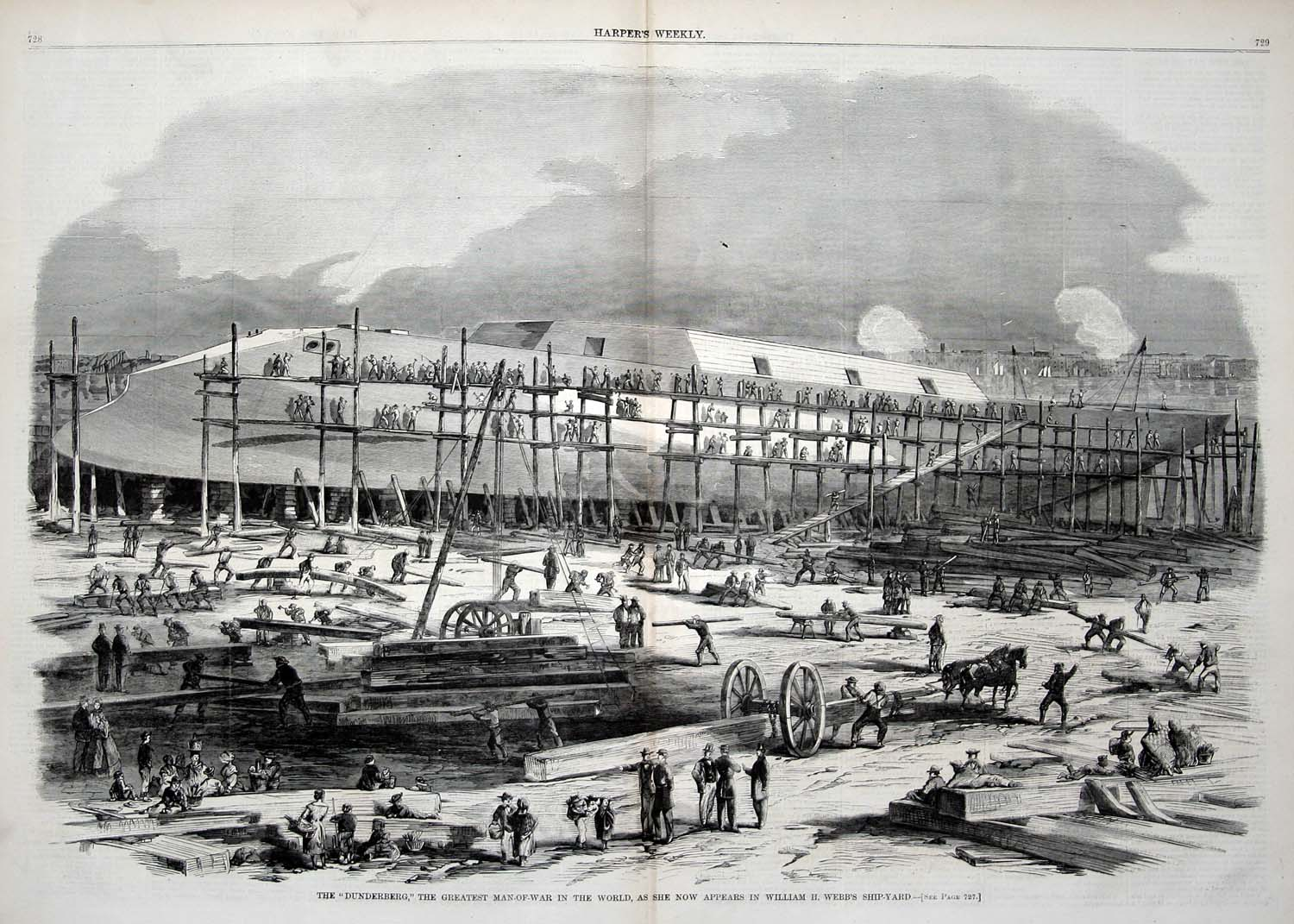
Illustration from Harper's Weekly showing Dunderberg under construction in late 1863. Note the prominent ram at the ship's bow.

Dunderberg was built with a plough-shaped 44-foot (13.4 m), ram bow of which the forward 12 feet (3.7 m) were sheathed in cast iron. Her full armament was not installed before she was sold, but gunnery trials were conducted in February 1867 with two 15-inch and four 11-inch guns. With a gun port height of 50 inches (1,270 mm), the 15-inch guns could elevate +8.5° and depress to −5°; equivalent figures for the 11-inch guns were +5° and −7°. The 15-inch guns could traverse 30° forward of the beam and 28° aft and the 11-inch Dahlgrens could bear 28° to both sides. The only significant problem encountered during the trials was that the gun deck was made of soft pine and did not withstand the force of recoil well.

Other problems that delayed the ship's completion were shortages of material, labor and money. Prices for pig iron and bar iron nearly tripled while boiler plate and copper roughly doubled. Wages of even inexperienced workers increased between 50 and 100 percent. The New York City draft riots in July 1863 and several machinist's strikes further slowed progress on Dunderberg. Webb failed to account for these problems when negotiating the ship's contract and he repeatedly tried to charge the Navy for alterations as well as use cheaper materials to reduce his costs. He also attempted to have his contract amended by act of Congress, but he was unsuccessful. The Navy agreed to pay for some of the changes made and it also reduced the reserve amount held back in case the ship did not meet her specifications in 1865.

By about 1864, both sides regarded the ship as a white elephant; Welles wrote in his diary that he would rather have the money than the ship and Webb was spending more money than he could anticipate from the contract. Nonetheless, he continued work on the Dunderberg as he had very little other work for his shipyard and, most importantly, in the hope of getting his contract amended to allow him to make a profit. On 22 July 1865, he launched the ship, now with her hull complete and about half of her armor installed, with much fanfare. The New York Times estimated a crowd of 20,000 watched the launching. The following year, the government rejected offers by Peru and Chile to purchase the ship, both then at war with Spain, lest the sale prejudice its lawsuit against Great Britain for selling warships to the Confederacy. Webb did manage to get a private bill passed by Congress in March 1867 that allowed him title to the ship once he repaid all monies advanced to him.

== French service ==
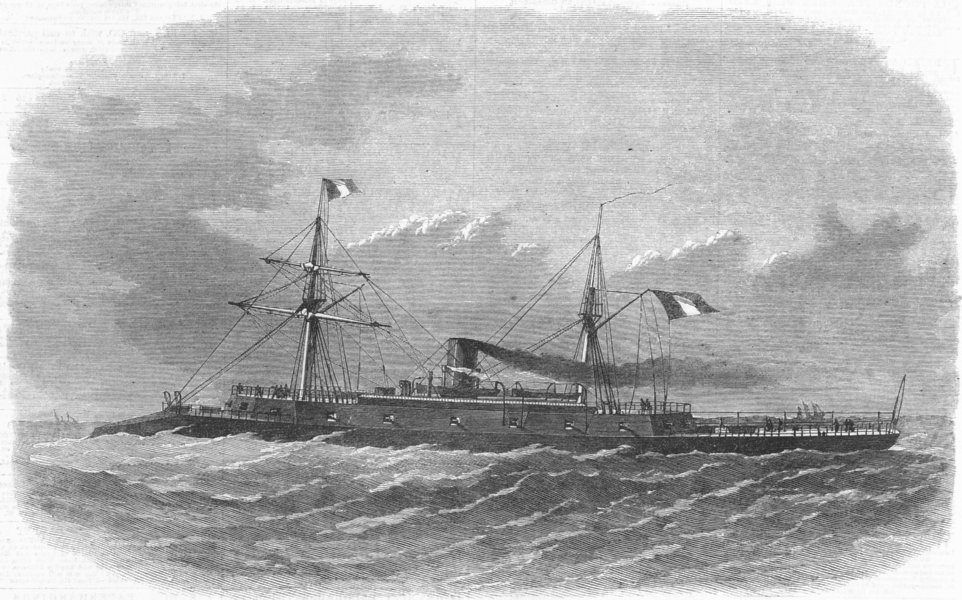
The French Ironclad Rochambeau, formerly the American Dunderberg, Illustrated London News

After Prussia expressed an interest in the ship, the Emperor of France, Napoleon III, bought her in April for 2.5 million dollars over the objections of his own navy, which preferred a home-built ship. The exact date of purchase is unknown, but Welles noted in his diary on 7 May that Webb had told him of the sale. On 27 June, Webb refunded the money that had been paid to him and also purchased those items furnished by the government. A little over a week later, he attempted to sail to France, but had to return to port the following day due to engine problems. These were not resolved until 19 July when he, and his entire family, set sail. Dunderberg arrived at Cherbourg on 3 August and the French Navy took possession three days later.

The ship was commissioned and renamed Rochambeau, in honor of the Comte de Rochambeau, a general during the American Revolution, on 7 August. After briefly running machinery trials two days later, Rochambeau began an overhaul in the naval dockyard at Cherbourg to fix problems that had become apparent during her delivery voyage and to modify her in accordance with French practices. These changes included the addition of a pilothouse on top of the conning tower, the replacement of the main rudder and the length of her stern was reduced somewhat. Her armament was removed and replaced by four Canon de 270 Modèle 1864/66 and 10 Canon de 24 C modèle 1864 (9.4 in) guns, both of which were breech-loading. The 15-caliber 270-millimeter (10.6 in) guns fired a 216-kilogram (476 lb) shell while the 17-caliber 240-millimeter (9.4 in) guns fired one that weighed 144 kilograms (317 lb). The 270 mm guns were mounted in the corners of the casemate and could pivot between a broadside gun port and one on the corner. Eight of the 240 mm guns were mounted on the broadside and the remaining two were positioned in the bow and stern gun ports. The remaining four gunports, those on the corners closest to the broadside, were plated over.

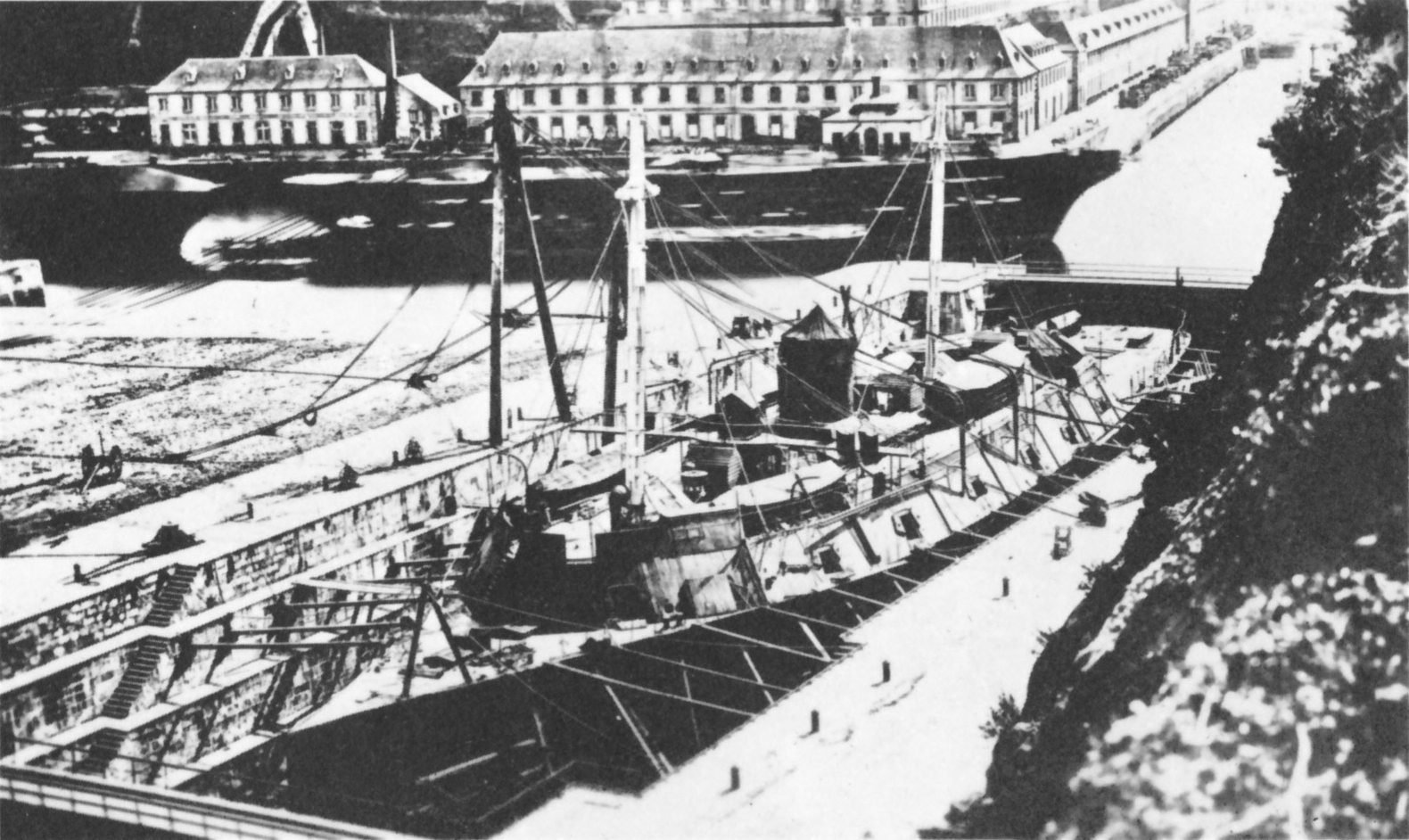
Rochambeau in dry dock at Brest navy yard

The French carefully measured the ship during her 1868 overhaul. At the waterline Rochambeau was 107.4 meters (352 ft 4 in) long and had a beam of 22.15 meters (72 ft 8 in). She had a mean draft of 6.5 meters (21 ft 4 in), a depth of hold of 7.078 meters (23 ft 2.7 in), and displaced 7,849 metric tons (7,725 long tons). They rated her engines at only 4,000 metric horsepower (2,900 kW), but they produced a maximum of 4,657 metric horsepower (3,425 kW) and gave a speed just over 15 knots during her machinery trials in June 1868 after the completion of her overhaul. At normal load she carried 540 tonnes (530 long tons) of coal and 735 tonnes (723 long tons) at deep load. In service the ship proved to burn a lot of coal, full bunkers and 30 tonnes (30 long tons) stored on deck provided her a range of only 2,200 kilometres (1,200 nmi) at a speed of 8 knots (15 km/h; 9.2 mph). They reduced her sail area to 954.42 square meters (10,273.3 sq ft).

They measured the ship's armor thickness throughout. The casemate was completely protected by 120-millimeter (4.7 in) plates. The hull armor extended to a depth of 2.5 meters (8.2 ft) below the waterline and its upper strake was 90 millimeters (3.5 in) thick while the lower was 70 millimeters (2.8 in) thick. Her decks were covered by 18-millimeter (0.7 in) plates and the sides of the conning tower were 250 millimeters (9.8 in) thick. In service, Rochambeau proved to be very wet and threw up a lot of spray in a head sea. She had a very quick roll which caused problems when trying to work the guns in heavy weather as even moderate seas could prevent their use altogether since the gun ports were only about 1.4 meters (4 ft 7 in) above the waterline. Under sail alone in a good breeze, the ship could not maintain her course, could not be steered and would turn until wind and wave were on her beam.

Rochambeau completed her refit on 18 May 1868 and was briefly under the command of Captain (Capitaine de vaisseau) Jules-François-Émile Krantz (a future Minister of Marine) before being decommissioned on 1 August and placed in reserve. She was refitted from August to December and had her forward hull armor plates replaced by a one-piece cast iron ram. Still in reserve in 1869, Rochambeau was modified with an additional 240 mm pivot gun mounted over the forward end of the casemate and the pine planking underneath the guns in the casemate was replaced by oak.

The ship was recommissioned with a crew of 600 men in mid-July 1870, just before the beginning of the Franco-Prussian War. She departed Cherbourg on 25 August to join the fleet in Danish waters and reached Copenhagen on 31 August. The fleet fruitlessly cruised the Baltic Sea for several weeks before they were ordered home on 16 September. Rochambeau's shallow draft meant that she and the armored corvette Thétis were ordered to search the mouth of the Jade Estuary on 26 September for Prussian ships, but they found nothing.

Upon her return, Rochambeau was decommissioned again and her crew was ordered to help defend Paris. The ship was stricken from the Navy List (Liste de la Flotte) on 15 April 1872 and was scrapped sometime in 1874.
