= Augusta Cohen Coontz =

American First Lady of Guam (1867–1940)

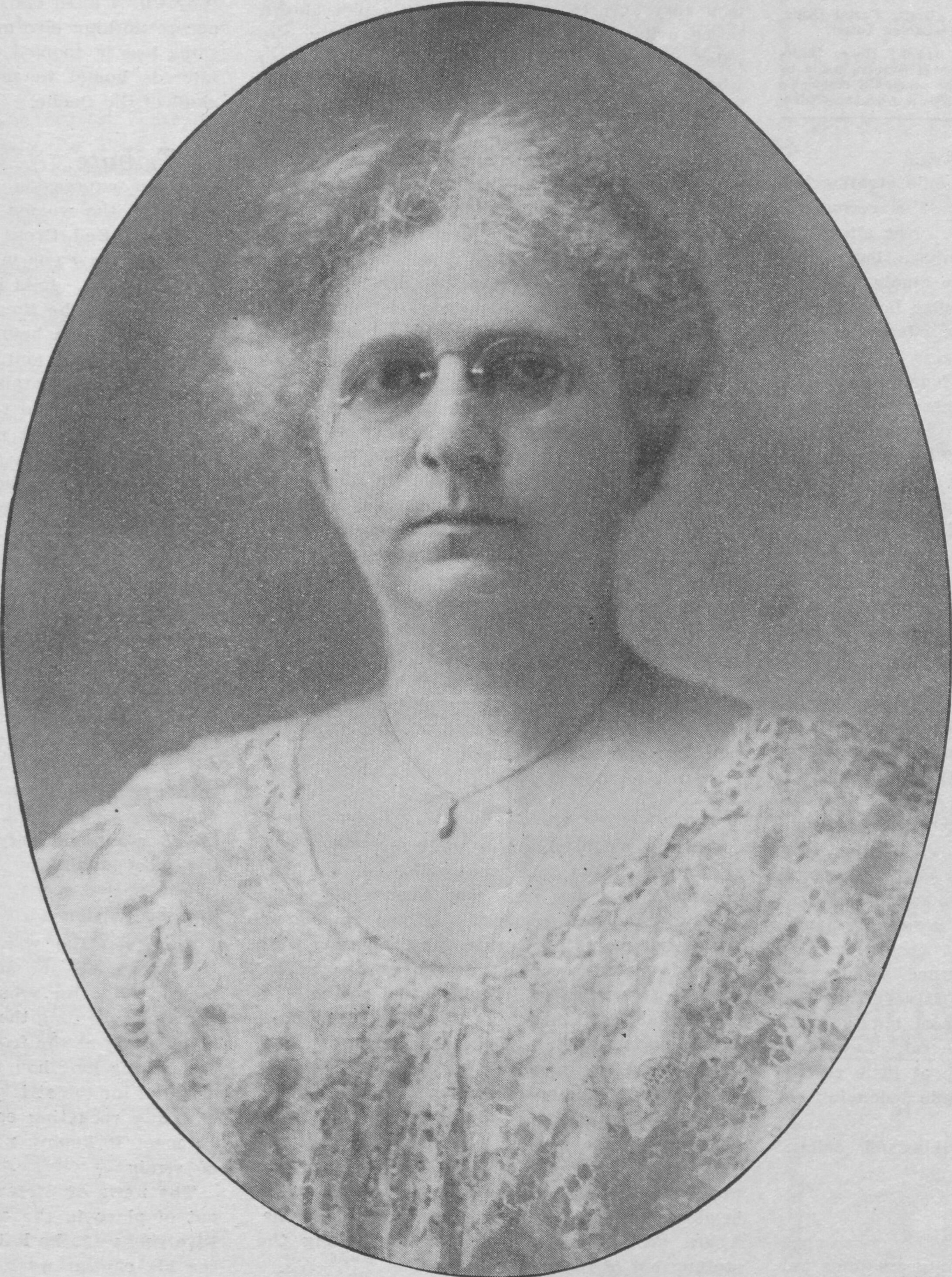
- Augusta Cohen Coontz, circa 1918

First Lady of Guam
- In role January 30, 1912 – September 23, 1913
- Governor: Robert Coontz

Personal details
- Born: May 3, 1867 California
- Died: April 7, 1940 (aged 72) Bremerton, Washington
- Spouse: Robert Coontz
- Children: 3
- Occupation: First Lady of Guam
- Other names: Augusta Cohen, Augusta C. Coontz, Augusta Coontz, Mrs. Robert Coontz

Augusta Cohen Coontz (May 3, 1867—April 7, 1940) was an American former First Lady of Guam.

== Early life ==
On May 3, 1867, Coontz was born as Augusta Cohen in California. Coontz's father was Abraham Cohen (1828–1892), a brewer. Coontz's mother was Bertha (née Daniels) Cohen (1830–1893). Coontz had eight siblings, including Louis, Rebecca, Paulina, Jacob, Aaron, Henrietta, Esther, and Marcus. Coontz grew up in Sitka, Alaska.

== Career ==
In 1912, when her husband Robert Coontz was appointed the Naval Governor of Guam, Coontz became the First Lady of Guam on January 30, 1912, until September 23, 1913.

By July 1925, Coontz had traveled around the world on her husband's ship, including China and Japan, and had arrived in Melbourne, Australia. She was personally greeted by Mr. Allan, the Premier of Victoria, Mr. E.J. Mackrell, the Secretary to the Premier, and Mr. N.L. Anderson, representative of the American Consulate. In Coontz's interview with a local newspaper, she mentioned that she and two other Naval officers' wives were staying at Menzie Hotel, one of the first grand Victorian-era hotels in Melbourne, Australia.

In 1925, During the visit of the United States Fleet to Australian waters, Norman L. Anderson, American Consul in charge of the Consulate General in Australia, entertained at a reception in honor of Coontz and her husband, Admiral Robert Coontz.

On August 5, 1925, Coontz was a hostess of a farewell ball in Melbourne, Australia's water for about 6,000 guests on USS Oklahoma, USS Nevada, and USS Pennsylvania.

== Personal life ==
In February 1885, Coontz's sister Henrietta Cohen became a Postmaster in Sitka, Alaska.

Coontz's sister Paulina Cohen became a schoolteacher and ran the Baranoff Hotel, then in August 1890, she became a Postmaster in Sitka, Alaska.

Coontz met Robert Coontz while he was on USS Pinta, that was stationed in Sitka, Alaska.

On October 31, 1890, in Sitka, Alaska, Coontz married Robert Coontz, who later became a Naval officer and Governor of Guam. They had three children: Benton, Kenneth, and Bertha. Coontz and her family lived in places including Sitka, Alaska, Guam, and Bremerton, Washington.

On January 26, 1935, Coontz's husband died at the Puget Sound Naval Hospital in Bremerton, Washington.

In 1940, Coontz lived with her daughter Bertha Coontz and a maid in Bremerton, Washington. On April 7, 1940, Coontz died in Bremerton, Washington.
