= Chester Rolling Mill =

Metal rolling mill in Pennsylvania, United States

Coordinates: 39.8307°N 75.3873°W

- Company type: Private
- Industry: Manufacturing
- Founded: 1873
- Founder: John Roach
- Defunct: n/a
- Headquarters: Chester, Pennsylvania, U.S.
- Products: Iron and steel ship hull and boiler plates, ship beams, pig iron
- Total equity: $600,000 (1880)
- Owner: John Roach (to 1885)
- Parent: John Roach & Sons

The Chester Rolling Mill was a large iron (later steel) rolling mill established by shipbuilder John Roach in Chester, Pennsylvania, United States, in 1873. The main purpose of the Mill was to provide metal hull plates, beams and other parts for the ships built at Roach's Delaware River Iron Ship Building and Engine Works, also located at Chester.

Amongst the mill's notable achievements, it manufactured the steel plates for the first steel-hulled steamship built in the United States, Alaskan, and for the U.S. Navy's first four steel ships, the so-called "ABCD ships". Production of the latter vessels drove Roach's shipbuilding empire into receivership after the government unexpectedly repudiated the contracts, and Roach was forced to sell the Chester Rolling Mill and most of his other companies to satisfy creditors. The Chester Rolling Mill later became part of the Wellman Steel Company.

== History ==
Roach established his shipyard, the Delaware River Iron Ship Building and Engine Works, on the Delaware River at Chester in 1871. He had two reasons for establishing the Chester Rolling Mill. Firstly, the locality of Chester lacked facilities for the large-scale production of iron plates and frames as required by his shipyard. Secondly, by establishing his own rolling mill, he could dispense with ironmaking subcontractors and thus reduce his overall costs. Roach's ownership of a network of companies supporting his shipyard, which included the Chester Rolling Mill, the Chester Pipe and Tube Company and later the Standard Steel Casting Company and the Combination Steel and Iron Company made John Roach & Sons one of the first large companies in the United States to adopt the vertical integration model.

=== Organization and structure ===
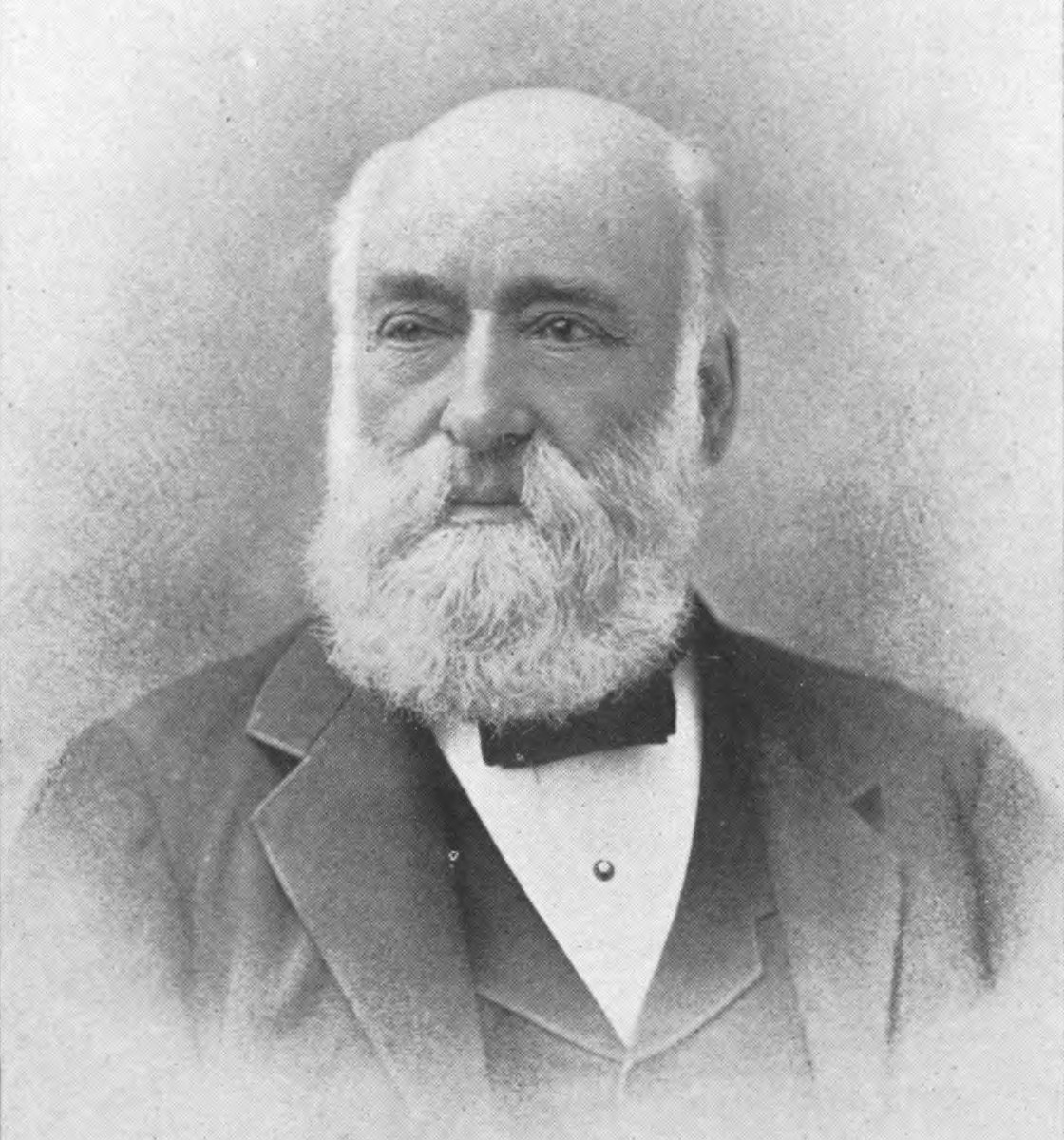
Samuel A. Crozer, business ally of Roach and future president of the firm

The Chester Rolling Mill was incorporated with a capital of $300,000 on March 10, 1875 by John Roach and a number of partners including Roach's sons John B. and Garrett, and local Chester business identities John Q. Denny and Charles B. and David Houston. The elder Roach became President of the new company, and Charles and David Houston were made general manager and paymaster respectively, while their brother Thomas also received a management position. Roach and his sons held the majority of shares.

The connection with the Houston family was of particular importance to Roach as the Houstons had investments in Pennsylvanian iron and coal mines, virtually guaranteeing the new company a reliable supply of raw materials. The Houstons also controlled Chester's only newspaper, the Chester Times, and they in turn shared business interests with Samuel A. Crozer, whose extended family—the wealthiest in Chester—owned the city's largest textile mills. Collectively, the Roach, Houston and Crozer families employed 25% of Chester's working population and accounted for 35% of its payroll, their partnership ensuring dominance of the city's politics.

=== Early period, 1875-1879 ===
The Chester Rolling Mill was established on the site of an old bridge and steel works at the foot of Wilson and Hayes Sts., Chester, incorporating the area between Townsend to Highland Ave., and from Front St. to the Delaware River. Construction of the main rolling mill, a building with dimensions of 160 x 185 feet, began in 1875. In 1879, the building was doubled in size, from 160 to 320 feet. Initial output was 700 tons of pig iron and 300 tons of iron ship plate. Pig iron, beams, and hull and boiler plates were produced both for Roach's main shipyard in Chester and for his other shipbuilding facility, the Morgan Iron Works in New York City.

With the establishment of the Mill, Roach was able to introduce a number of innovations into the industry which reduced time and cut costs. To begin with, he rejected the standard ship plate size of 12 ft × 4 ft (3.7 m × 1.2 m) and rolled larger plates of 14 ft × 5 ft (4.3 m × 1.5 m). This simple innovation reduced the time spent in planing, punching and chipping plates by 40%, reduced handling times, and had the added advantage of producing a stronger ship with fewer butts to strain. Roach also endeavoured as far as possible to roll plates to their finished dimensions, saving time which other companies spent on reworking plates at the shipyard.

=== Expansion of facilities, 1880-81 ===
In 1880, Roach embarked on a substantial upgrade of the mill's facilities. A second blast furnace was constructed above the original rolling mill, along with new buildings covering about 1 1/4 acres, including a new 90 ft × 140 ft (27 m × 43 m) steelworks. The new furnace commenced production on November 1, 1881. In order to pay for the expansion, the firm was recapitalized at $600,000.

By this time, the mill included two puddling mills with 11 furnaces and a total output of 50 tons per day, a mill for boiler and ship plate with a capacity of 45 tons per day, and a mill for angle, beam and skelp iron with a daily capacity of 35 tons. Included in the above were two large gas-operated furnaces and a mill which could produce plates from 1/8-to-6 in (3-to-152 mm) thickness and 27 feet (8.2 m) wide. Roach's milling machines incorporated both vertical and horizontal rollers which allowed plates to be finished with parallel edges, eliminating the necessity of shearing ragged edges to size. Some of the new machinery was capable of rolling steel as well as iron ingots.

Power to operate the milling machines was provided by four large Corliss steam engines and eight smaller ones. A five-ton steam hammer was also installed. After the expansion, the mill could produce 300 tons of steel plate a day in addition to the 300 tons of iron plate and 700 tons of pig iron already produced. The mill as a whole consumed 1,400 tons of iron ore, 600 tons of limestone and 1,000 tons of coal per week. The workforce was also expanded to 500 people, with a weekly payroll of $6,000.

A notable achievement for the company following the addition of the steel milling facilities was the production of steel plates for America's first steel-hulled ship, Alaskan, built by the Roach shipyard for the Oregon Railway and Navigation Company and delivered in August 1883.

=== ABCD ships and Roach receivership ===
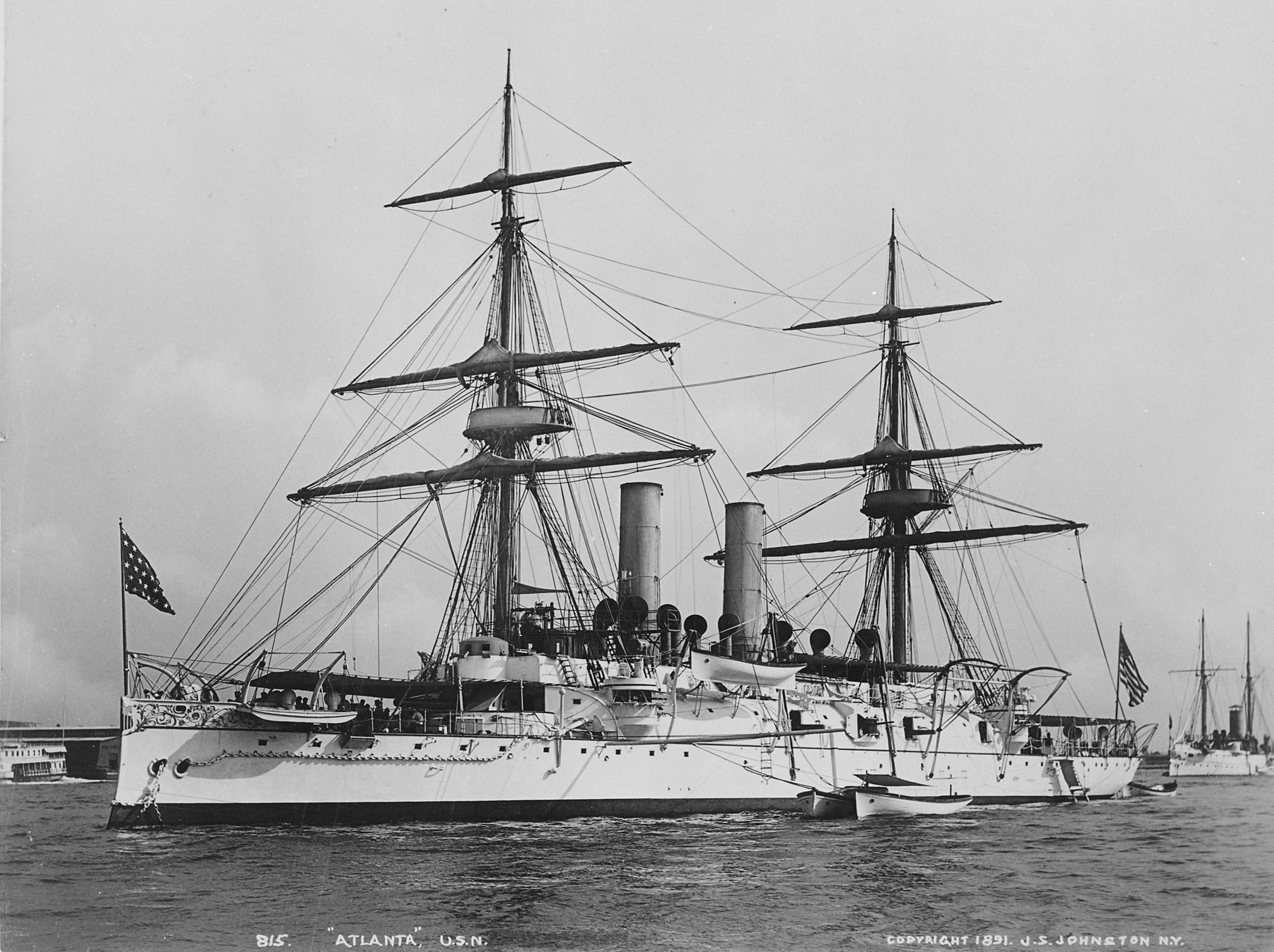
USS Atlanta, one of the U.S. Navy's first four steel warships. Most of the steel components for the four ships were manufactured at the Chester Rolling Mill

On July 2, 1883, John Roach & Sons won the contracts for all four of the Navy's first steel ships—Atlanta, Boston, Chicago, and Dolphin—or the "ABCD ships", as they came to be known. The only bidder with his own steel mill, Roach was able to undercut the other bidders by a total of $270,000 on the price of steel alone. The final contracts were signed on July 23 and Roach began construction of the ships shortly thereafter.

Roach was initially confident that he would have no difficulty supplying the steel for the four ships. To ensure the minimum of delay, he subcontracted with several other steel manufacturers, including the Norway Iron and Steel Company of South Boston, the Park Brothers' Black Diamond Works of Pittsburgh, and the Phoenix Iron Company of Phoenixville, Pennsylvania, for the supply of various steel parts. So exacting were the specifications however, that a third of all the parts produced were rejected by Navy inspectors, leading to cost overruns which eventually persuaded the subcontractors to renege on their agreements with Roach. Roach was left having to manufacture all the steel parts himself, although the situation was somewhat alleviated by the fact that another Roach company, the Standard Steel Casting Company, had recently begun production.

Delays in production of the steel along with additional unexpected delays prolonged construction of the ships past the 1884 Presidential election, and by the time Roach was ready to deliver the first ship, Dolphin, the new Democrat administration of Grover Cleveland, who became President on March 4, 1885, hostile to the staunchly Republican Roach, had assumed office. In what many regarded as a politically motivated act, the new Cleveland administration found reasons to void Roach's contract for Dolphin.

With another three Navy ships still unpaid for in his shipyard whose contracts might also be declared void, Roach was unable to secure loans to continue his business and was forced into receivership. In the subsequent liquidation of assets, the Chester Rolling Mill along with the rest of Roach's companies, with the exception of his Chester shipyard and the Morgan Iron Works in New York, were sold to pay off creditors.

=== Later history ===
After selling their shares in the Chester Rolling Mill, Roach and his sons resigned from their positions in February 1886, and the mill appears to have been taken over by Roach's former partner Samuel A. Crozer, who became the company's new president.

In 1890, the mill was purchased by Samuel Taylor Wellman, becoming part of the Wellman Steel Company. This venture proved unsuccessful, and Wellman dispensed with his holdings in about 1896.
