= Harriman Historic District =

Historic district in Pennsylvania, United States

- U.S. National Register of Historic Places
- U.S. Historic district
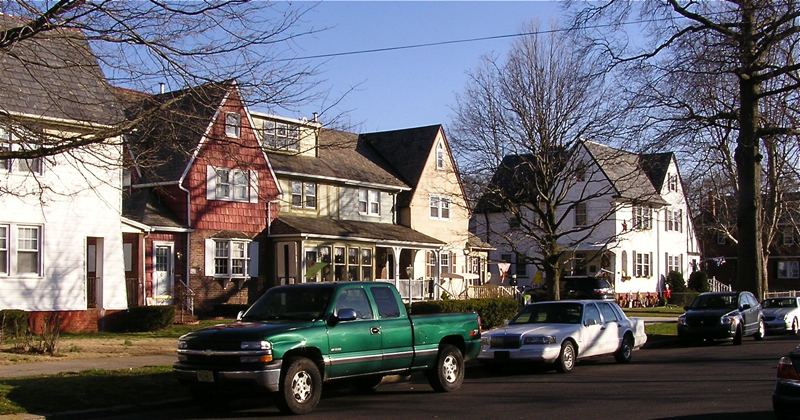
- Harriman district in Bristol, Pennsylvania.

- Location within Pennsylvania Location within the United States
- Location: Bristol, PA
- Nearest city: Philadelphia
- Coordinates: 40°06′31″N 74°50′39″W
- Area: 17 acres (6.9 ha)
- Built: 1907–1921
- Architect: Fred T. Ley Company, Inc.
- Architectural style: Colonial Revival, Tudorbethan
- NRHP reference No.: 87000673
- Added to NRHP: April 30, 1987

The Harriman Historic District is located in the northern section of Bristol, Pennsylvania, United States. It is a 17-acre (6.9 ha) residential area with 109 buildings, mostly houses, and the local secondary school.

By 1921, production at the shipyard had declined due to a postwar shipbuilding slump. The government consequently closed the shipyard and put many of the residential houses up for auction. Most remain standing today, and in 1987 the district was added to the National Register of Historic Places as a well-preserved example of a government planned and financed residential neighborhood from the World War I era.

== Geography ==
The district is slightly oval in shape, bounded by East and West Circle on the north and south, Farragut Avenue on the east and Trenton Avenue to the west. This neighborhood contains 109 buildings, all but five of which are contributing properties to its historic character.

In designing the project, the original architects strove to provide not mere accommodation, but as far as practicable to add individuality to the family buildings, most of which are finished in Tudor Revival or Colonial Revival styles, with brick first floors, stuccoed or wood-ornamented second floors, large porches and steeply pitched gable roofs. The only major surviving non-residential structure, Bristol Junior/Senior High School, was also built as Harriman Public School along with the original housing.

About 100 of the original buildings survive today, although most of the original non-residential buildings, including the hotel and the restaurant, were demolished years ago to make room for more residential properties. The streets, many of which are named after American Presidents, are wide and tree-lined.

There are also six rows of earlier company housing built in 1907 for the employees of the defunct Standard Cast Iron Pipe & Foundry Company, from which Harriman purchased the property. These houses with their uniform design represent a sharp contrast to the individually tailored houses constructed by the EFC.

== History ==
In 1917, railroad heir W. Averell Harriman, anticipating the entry of the United States into World War I, established the Merchant Shipbuilding Corporation (MSC) to build merchant ships for the war effort. Harriman began by purchasing the old shipyard of John Roach & Sons on the Delaware River in Chester, Pennsylvania. He also purchased a waterfront property upriver at Bristol, from the bankrupt Standard Cast Iron Pipe & Foundry Company, where he intended to build a more modern shipyard. After the entry of the United States into the war however, Harriman negotiated an agreement with the Emergency Fleet Corporation whereby the EFC undertook to build the Bristol shipyard and lease it from MSC in return for MSC's construction of forty 9,000 ton freighters at the yard for a fixed price. The first keels were laid at the yard in September 1917 and the first launching took place in August 1918.

The shipyard built by the EFC attracted 11,000 workers and their families to Bristol, and the local property market was quickly exhausted. After rejecting a proposal to declare the city a war zone in order to requisition existing housing for the shipyard workers, the EFC decided to initiate an ambitious new housing project instead. The project was approved by the U.S. Congress in December 1917, and $35 million was appropriated to pay for it.

The Bristol housing project—the largest single housing project undertaken by the EFC—created an entire new township in Bristol which was dubbed "Harriman" after the proprietor of the MSC. Construction began in March 1918 and the first buildings were completed by July, although workers at first declined to occupy them due to high rents. When completed, the new township comprised 320 houses, 278 apartments and 22 dormitories housing a total of 3,800 workers and their families. The township had its own sewage, water and lighting systems, and 212 of the apartments and 66 bungalows were supplied with steam heating from a central heating plant. In addition to the housing itself, 18 stores, a school, a 40-bed hospital, a 500-room hotel known as the "Victory Hotel" and a vast "Merchant Restaurant" capable of serving 12,000 meals a day were constructed.

In spite of the great expense that went into construction of the Bristol shipyard and the new township of Harriman, the yard was unable to complete a single ship before the end of the war. However, both the EFC and Harriman himself anticipated a shipbuilding boom in the postwar period, and it was decided to complete all forty of the merchant ships originally ordered. Contrary to their expectations however, the war was followed not by a boom but by a shipbuilding slump. By 1921 there was no more work for the shipyard, and in February of that year it was permanently closed. The government thereafter auctioned off the properties of Harriman township by individual lot, but was able to realize only $870,000 from the sale as opposed to the original design and construction cost of $5.6 million. Harriman township was subsequently incorporated into the Borough of Bristol, which assumed all responsibility for provision of services. In 1987, the township was added to the National Register of Historic Places as Harriman Historic District.

Harriman Historic District is recognized today for its association with the World War I mobilization effort, its significance as the largest housing project undertaken by the EFC, and its relative integrity as an example of a government planned and financed residential community from World War I era.
