= USS Suwanee (1864) =

Mohongo-class gunboat

History

United States
- Name: USS Suwanee
- Namesake: Suwannee River
- Builder: Reaney, Son & Archbold (Chester, Pennsylvania)
- Cost: $171,000
- Launched: 13 Mar 1864
- Acquired: 14 Dec 1864
- Commissioned: 23 Jan 1865
- Out of service: 9 Jul 1866
- Stricken: 1866
- Fate: Wrecked, 9 July 1866, off British Columbia

General characteristics
- Type: Double-ended, iron-hulled gunboat
- Displacement: 1,030 tons
- Length: 255 ft 0 in (77.72 m)
- Beam: 35 ft 0 in (10.67 m)
- Draught: depth of hold 12' 0"; draft 9' 0"
- Propulsion: 1 × 58 inch bore, 8 ft 9 in stroke inclined direct-acting steam engine with surface condenser; 4 boilers—2 × main tubular, 2 × superheating; sidewheels
- Sail plan: Two-masted schooner
- Speed: Max. 15 kn (17 mph); cruising 8 kn (9.2 mph)
- Complement: 159
- Armament: 2 × 100-pounder Parrott rifles; 4 × 9-in Dahlgren smoothbores; 2 × 24-pounder howitzers; 2 × 20-pounder Dahlgren rifles

The first USS Suwanee was a 3rd-rate gunboat commissioned by the Union Navy in its struggle against the Confederate States of America in the American Civil War.

Commissioned late in the war, Suwanee spent several weeks searching for the Confederate raider CSS Shenandoah without success. Suwanee was eventually wrecked off British Columbia in 1868.

== Construction and design ==
Suwanee—a double-ended, iron-hulled, sidewheel-propelled gunboat—was built for the U.S. Navy by Reaney, Son & Archbold of Chester, Pennsylvania. She was 255 feet in length, with a beam of 35 feet, draft of 9 feet, hold depth of 12 feet and displacement of 1,030 tons.

Suwanee was powered by a 58-inch bore, 8-foot 9-inch stroke, inclined, direct-acting steam engine, fitted with a surface condenser. Steam was supplied by four boilers: two main boilers of the horizontal, tubular type, and two superheated. The ship was also rigged as a two-masted schooner for auxiliary sail power. Total cost of the vessel was $171,000.

Suwanee was launched on 13 March 1864, delivered to the Navy at the Philadelphia Navy Yard on 14 December, and commissioned on 23 January 1865, Comdr. Paul Shirley in command.

== Service history ==
Ordered to the Pacific Ocean, the new double-ender departed Philadelphia, Pennsylvania, at dawn on 17 February 1865 and proceeded via New York City down the Atlantic coast of the Americas looking for Confederate commerce raiders, especially for CSS Shenandoah, which had been plaguing Northern shipping.

She then steamed up the Pacific coast and arrived at Acapulco, Mexico, where she joined the Pacific Squadron on 30 July. The side-wheeler was promptly ordered to sea in quest of Shenandoah. After the Southern cruiser Shenandoah surrendered at Liverpool, England, late in the year, Suwanee cruised along the Pacific coast from Mexico to Canada.

On 9 July 1868, Suwanee was wrecked in Shadwell Passage, Queen Charlotte Sound, British Columbia.

== See also ==
- Confederate States Navy

== Bibliography ==
- Daniels, Josephus, ed. (1921): Official records of the Union and Confederate Navies in the War of the Rebellion, Series II, Volume I, p. 217, Government Printing Office, Washington.
