= Chester Assembly =

Ford manufacturing plant in Pennsylvania, US

Coordinates: 39.8386373°N 75.3693949°W

Chester Assembly is a former Ford manufacturing plant in Chester, Pennsylvania. It was located at Front & Lloyd Streets and occupied over 50 acres when it was open, and occupied the former Roach's Shipyard and Merchant Shipbuilding Corporation on Front Street from Fulton to Pennell streets. The factory began operations in August 1927 building the Ford Model A and was closed in February 1961, and operations were transferred to Mahwah, New Jersey. The physical address is now known as 800 W. Front St. and is divided into several businesses, predominantly GWSI, M&M Industries, and Dee Paper Co. The rail lines are still in use and terminate under an awning structure near the old assembly area.
