= Merchant Shipbuilding Corporation =

Coordinates: 40.103186°N 74.841773°W

- Type: Private
- Industry: Manufacturing
- Predecessor: Chester Shipbuilding Co.
- Founded: 1917
- Founder: W. Averell Harriman
- Defunct: 1923
- Successor: Ford Assembly Plant
- Headquarters: Chester, Pennsylvania, United States
- Products: Ships
- Owner: W. Averell Harriman

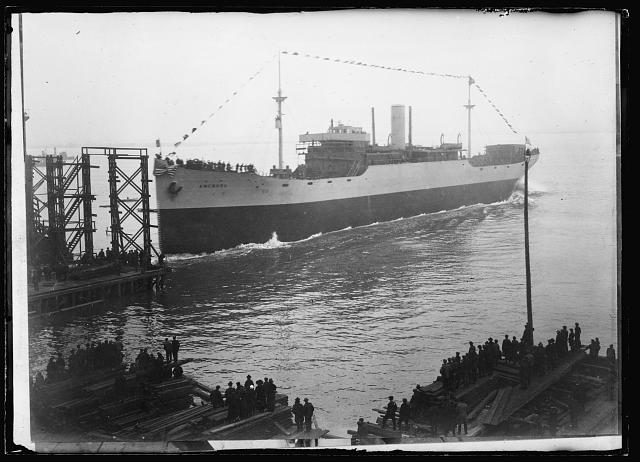
Launch of the Amcross at the Merchant Shipbuilding Corporation in Chester, Pennsylvania, November 28, 1919

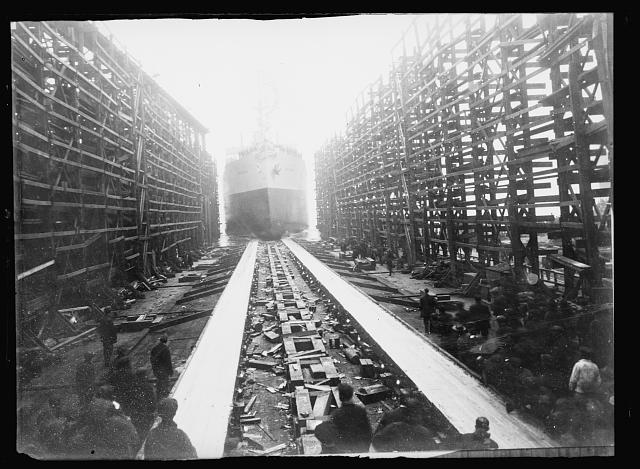
Launch of the Amcross at Merchant Shipbuilding Corporation as seen from the docks

The Merchant Shipbuilding Corporation (abbreviated MSC) was an American corporation established in 1917 by railroad heir W. Averell Harriman to build merchant ships for the Allied war effort in World War I. The MSC operated two shipyards: the former shipyard of John Roach & Sons at Chester, Pennsylvania, and a second, newly established emergency yard at Bristol, Pennsylvania, operated by the MSC on behalf of the U.S. Shipping Board's Emergency Fleet Corporation (EFC).

MSC completed only four ships before the war's end. However, both the U.S. Shipping Board and Harriman himself anticipated a shipbuilding boom in the postwar period, and consequently MSC continued to work on its wartime contracts, eventually building some 81 ships, including not only the USSB vessels but also four minesweepers for the U.S. Navy, a number of oil tankers for private companies, and four passenger liners Harriman built for his own shipping lines.

Both Harriman and the USSB were completely incorrect in their anticipation of a postwar shipbuilding boom, and by the early 1920s there was such an excess of shipping around the world that over 1,000 ships were laid up in ports in the United States. With no market for its services, Harriman wound up the Merchant Shipbuilding Corporation in 1923.

== Background ==
In 1908, the Roach family, which had operated the famous shipyard of Delaware River Iron Ship Building and Engine Works at Chester, Pennsylvania since 1871, decided to retire from the shipbuilding business. The shipyard lay idle for some years, until being purchased by mechanic and former naval officer Captain C. P. M. (Charles) Jack in late 1913.

Jack renamed the yard the Chester Shipbuilding Company, and used it mostly for converting freighters into oil tankers. Lacking steel fabrication facilities of his own, Jack contracted with the American Bridge Company in Pittsburgh to supply the plates for the ships' hulls and oil tanks. This innovation in building ships from prefabricated parts manufactured in distant locations was made possible by Jack's simplified hull designs, which made as much use as possible of flat steel plates that could be easily produced and which required a minimum of post-production fitting. Jack's prefabricated method would later be emulated by the Emergency Fleet Corporation in its emergency wartime shipyards.

In addition to his ship conversions, Jack also built two complete oil tankers for a Norwegian company in 1916.

== Harriman takeover ==
In February 1917, railroad heir W. Averell Harriman, anticipating the entry of the United States into World War I, bought the Chester Shipbuilding Company from Charles Jack. Retaining Jack as a consultant engineer, Harriman renamed the business the Merchant Shipbuilding Corporation.

By the time the United States declared war in April, Harriman had secured orders with private companies for a total of 28 ships, including 22 freighters and 6 oil tankers. With the declaration of war however, the U.S. Shipping Board commandeered all the contracts, making itself the company's sole customer. To accelerate production, Harriman spent $3,000,000 upgrading the yard's facilities, increasing the number of building slipways from six to ten, and making further extensions and improvements.

== Bristol yard ==
In August 1917, Harriman secured a contract from the EFC for an additional 40 freighters. As the Chester yard was already busy with existing contracts, Harriman and the EFC agreed to build an entirely new shipyard to fulfill the order. Harriman pledged that the last ship would be delivered from the yard within eighteen months. A second contract, for an additional 20 freighters, was signed three months later, but this contract was cancelled in 1919.

Harriman chose as the location for the new yard the city of Bristol, Pennsylvania, 25 miles (40 km) north of Philadelphia and 100 miles (160 km) upriver from the coast—the northernmost location of any Delaware River shipyard. He purchased a 260-acre (1.1 km^{2}) block of property along the river, and built a yard containing a dozen slipways. Extensive dredging was necessary as the riverbank at this point was not deep enough for the launching of large ships. When completed, the $12,000,000 yard was leased by the EFC but managed by the MSC.

In addition to the yard itself, an entire township was built to provide housing for the shipyard's 3,000 workers and their families, estimated at 15,000 people in total. The township, which was given the name of "Harriman", was composed of 206 group houses, 26 single houses, 25 duplex houses and 212 apartments plus boarding houses and bachelor quarters, as well as a post office, hotel, hospital and other facilities. The EFC contracted the work to local realtors who arranged the mortgages. Construction of the township was the largest single housing project undertaken by the EFC during the First World War.

== Wartime operations, 1917-1918 ==
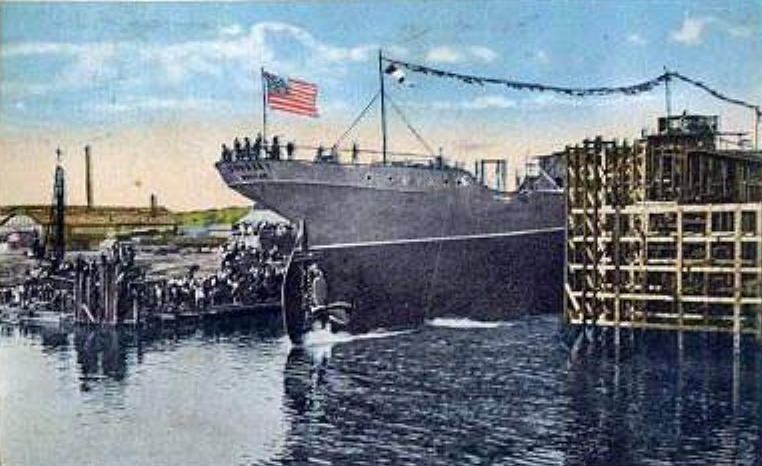
Launch of MSC's first ship, SS Sudbury, on 29 September 1917.

The Merchant Shipbuilding Corporation launched its first ship, a freighter named Sudbury, at the Chester yard on 29 September 1917, and delivered it to the USSB on May 5, 1918. In spite of the company's best efforts however, only four ships of the 68 ordered by the USSB were delivered before the end of hostilities—one freighter and three tankers, all built at the Chester yard. The Chester yard also received a contract from the U.S. Navy for the construction of four minesweepers, but the first of these was also only delivered a few weeks after the war.

Construction at the Bristol yard was delayed by the extensive dredging required to provide deep enough channels in which to launch the ships. A series of seven strikes in 1917, prompted by the failure of wages to keep pace with the large 25% increase in inflation brought about by wartime conditions, did not help matters, although the MSC quickly acquiesced to the wage demands, thus minimizing disruption. A further problem for the yard however was the inexperience of the employees, since all the experienced shipyard workers were already employed at existing yards.

In the event, Harriman was unable to deliver a single ship from the Bristol yard in the first eighteen months, contrary to his stated intention to have all forty ships delivered in the same time frame. The first ship from Bristol was delivered nineteen months after the signing of the initial contract, which was four months too late to see service in the war.

== Postwar period, 1919-1923 ==
In the postwar period, a decision had to be made about whether or not to cancel the contracts for the as-yet 64 undelivered vessels, 22 of which were already on the slipways and work on the remainder having not yet begun. Both the USSB and Harriman himself anticipated a postwar shipbuilding boom, and so the decision was taken to complete the contracts. This decision would turn out to be woefully wrong, but the error was not yet apparent.

Both of MSC's yards were kept busy with the existing USSB contracts until late 1920/early 1921, and in late 1920 the Chester yard was able to secure private contracts for the construction of four oil tankers. Harriman had recently acquired several shipping lines of his own, and he now began to build ships at the Chester yard for his own lines. In 1921, he built the 7,300-ton passenger-cargo ships Mount Carroll and Mount Clinton for his transatlantic shipping line United American Lines, and in 1921 he built two further passenger-cargo vessels, the 5,900-ton Californian and Missourian for his Hawaiian-American Line.

Mount Carroll and Mount Clinton had been outfitted as third-class passenger ships for employment in the immigrant trade, but when the Harding administration imposed immigration restrictions, Harriman was forced to refit the two ships as freighters. There were already far too many freighters in transatlantic service however, and Harriman was soon forced to sell both ships. Likewise, his two Hawaiian-American passenger liners were to fail due to stiff competition from the Matson Navigation Company. The global oversupply of shipping was becoming increasingly evident.

By 1922, more than a thousand steamships lay idle in the United States alone, and work in the shipbuilding industry was virtually nonexistent. When the last of the USSB orders rolled off the ways at Bristol, Harriman transferred the yard back to the ownership of the EFC, but he attempted to keep the Chester yard open by diversifying his product line. The MSC announced that it would diversify into "steel construction in general, manufacturing and power plant equipment, machinery and machine work, railroad equipment and material, and plate shop works." Due to increasing specialization however, the era in which shipbuilding companies could readily diversify into other fields had passed. Harriman was forced to close the Chester shipyard in 1923, and the Merchant Shipbuilding Corporation was subsequently transformed into an investment vehicle known as Merchant-Sterling.

== The ships ==
SS Winyah, a typical MSC freighter, designed to USSB standard #1025. The type's flat, prefabricated hull plates are clearly visible in this photo

Unlike the other so-called "agency yards"—the yards built on behalf of the EFC—the MSC ships were not built to a USSB design. Rather, they were designed by the company itself, with Jack as a consultant engineer and with oversight by R. H. M. Robinson, the company's president who was also a well-known naval architect. The basic design was given the USSB number #1025, although some variants were given different numbers.

The #1025 type was of 8,800 tons deadweight, with a length of 418 feet (127 m), beam 54 feet (16 m) and draft of 25 feet (7.6 m). Each ship was fitted with three Babcock & Wilcox oil-burning boilers (convertible to coal), delivering steam to 3,000 horsepower Westinghouse oil-fired geared turbines driving a single propeller, which gave a speed of 11 to 12 knots (22 km/h).

A total of 81 ships were built by the company—40 at the Bristol plant and 41 at Chester. All 40 ships from the Bristol yard were Type #1025 freighters. The Chester yard built 22 freighters, 10 oil tankers, four U.S. Navy minesweepers, four passenger-cargo liners, and one fireboat.

More than half the ships were scrapped in the 1930s. Of those that survived into World War II, most fell victim to U-boats. Only a handful of MSC ships survived into the postwar era. The longest-serving MSC ship was Yapalaga, a freighter built at the Bristol yard in 1920. She was scrapped in 1970 having provided 50 years of service. The passenger-cargo liner Missourian, built at Chester in 1922, was also scrapped in 1970.

== Fate of the shipyards ==
Following the Harriman sale in 1923, the Chester shipyard, which had been in existence since 1859 and built close to 350 ships during the course of its history, was sold to the Ford Motor Company and became a factory for Ford motor vehicles called Chester Assembly. The factory was closed in 1961.

The Bristol shipyard was sold privately and the site utilized for a variety of purposes. Today it is partly occupied by a marina. Some of the original shipyard buildings reportedly still exist.

Harriman township, built to accommodate the shipyard's workers, was eventually incorporated into the borough of Bristol. The township, built in a distinctive neo-colonial style, is listed with the National Register of Historic Places, and is known today as Harriman Historic District.

== See also ==
- Reaney, Son & Archbold
- Delaware River Iron Ship Building and Engine Works
- John Roach & Sons
- Harriman Historic District
