= Standard Steel Casting Company =

Thurlow Works, Pennsylvania

- Company type: Private
- Industry: Manufacturing
- Predecessor: None
- Founded: 1883
- Founder: John Roach
- Defunct: 1892
- Successor: American Steel Casting Company; Amsted Industries (modern successor)
- Headquarters: Chester, Pennsylvania, United States
- Products: Steel ingots, railcar frames and couplings, anchors, ship parts and other heavy steel castings
- Owner: John Roach (1883-84); Robert Wetherill & Assoc. (1884-92)
- Parent: John Roach & Sons (1883-84)

The Standard Steel Casting Company, commonly referred to as Thurlow Works, was a steel production and steel casting facility founded in Chester, Pennsylvania, in 1883 by shipbuilder John Roach. The company was established primarily to supply steel ingots for Roach's steel mills, which included the Chester Rolling Mill and the Combination Steel and Iron Company, although it also manufactured steel castings. Standard Steel was the first company in the United States to manufacture commercial quantities of steel utilizing the acid open hearth process.

Roach relinquished majority ownership of the company in 1884 to Robert Wetherill. In subsequent years, Thurlow Works made a name for itself as a manufacturer of large steel castings, especially for the railroad industry. America's first cast steel locomotive frames were poured at Thurlow in 1893.

The Standard Steel Casting Company was merged with several other steel casting companies in 1892 to become the American Steel Casting Company. The American Steel Casting Company was itself merged some years later to form American Steel Foundries, which presently exists as Amsted Industries.

== History ==
In 1880, shipbuilder John Roach, proprietor of America's largest shipbuilding company, John Roach & Sons, established the Combination Steel and Iron Company to take advantage of the growing demand for steel products in the United States. Roach initially used the company to manufacture steel rails for the country's rapidly expanding railroad industry, but he soon discovered that America's existing steelmaking firms could not keep pace with nationwide demand, frequently leaving his new company unsupplied. Roach decided to rectify the problem by founding his own steelmaking firm, and on July 22, 1883, he incorporated the Standard Steel Casting Company on ten acres of land at Thurlow Station, on the Philadelphia, Wilmington and Burwood Railroad line, not far from his network of other companies in Chester.

Roach selected a highly respected metallurgist to manage the new plant, Pedro G. Salom, who had considerable experience in steel quality control methods. Salom became president of the company, while William E. Trainer, Richard Wetherill and John B. Booth became vice-president, treasurer and secretary respectively.

For the steelmaking process itself, Roach and Salom selected the new Siemens-Martin open hearth process, which differed from the more well established Bessemer process by being slower and more easily controlled, allowing for a higher quality of finished product. Roach installed a 10-ton Siemens furnace and an 18-pot Siemens crucible furnace, allowing for the production of 18,000 tons of steel ingots and 3,000 tons of steel castings per annum. The Works, which commenced production on March 1, 1884, was housed in a 160 x 114 foot building and employed a workforce of 70 hands.

=== Heavy castings company ===
In 1884, Roach, possibly due to his growing cash flow problems, relinquished majority control of the Standard Steel Casting Company to Robert Wetherill & Associates. The Works soon began making steel castings for the railroad industry, such as driving boxes and crossheads for locomotives.

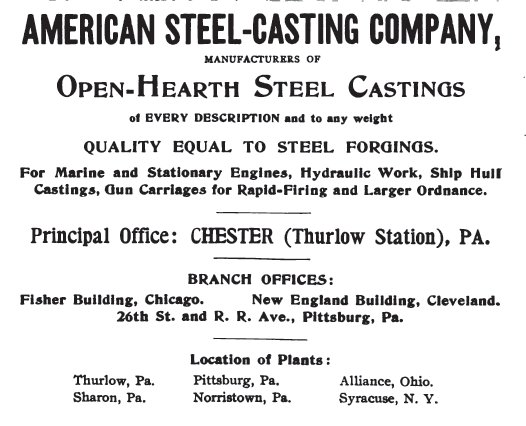
An 1899 advertisement for Standard Steel's successor, the American Steel Casting Company, which was headquartered at Thurlow Works

The company gradually acquired a reputation for itself as a manufacturer of heavy steel castings and as a pioneer in steel casting experimentation. In 1888, for example, the company accepted an experiment to build one of the largest steel-cast guns ever produced in the United States to that time, a six-inch rifled breech-loader weighing approximately 11,000 pounds. The weapon was manufactured using the company's open hearth process, while another company built a second weapon using the Bessemer process. In test firings, the Bessemer-produced gun failed after only the second round. The Thurlow-produced gun fired all ten of its test rounds without incident, but was finally failed after the barrel was found to have become slightly enlarged. The Thurlow Works management later had the gun mounted in its yard as testimony of "a courageous attempt to expand the uses of cast steel."

Other large and difficult jobs taken on by Thurlow Works included castings for ship anchors, stern posts for battleships and large industrial housings. In 1893, the company became the first in the United States to manufacture a complete cast steel frame for a locomotive, built for the Baldwin Locomotive Works.

=== Later history ===
In 1892, Thurlow Works was merged with several other steel casting companies including the Solid Steel Company of Alliance, Ohio, to become the American Steel Casting Company. The new company was headed by a prominent executive in the steel industry, Dan Eagan. In 1902, the American Steel Casting Company was itself merged with several other large steelmaking firms across the country to become one of America's largest steel casting companies, American Steel Foundries, a specialist in the manufacture of railcar frames and couplings and other railcar parts. In 1962, American Steel Foundries changed its name to Amsted Industries. In 1998, it became completely employee-owned.

As of 2026, Amsted Industries manufactures cast and forged components for railcars, automobiles, and commercial vehicles such as brakes, wheels and bogie assemblies, as well as industrial thermal management structures through its Baltimore Air Coil division.
