= USS Sangamon (1862) =

1862 Passaic-class ironclad monitor

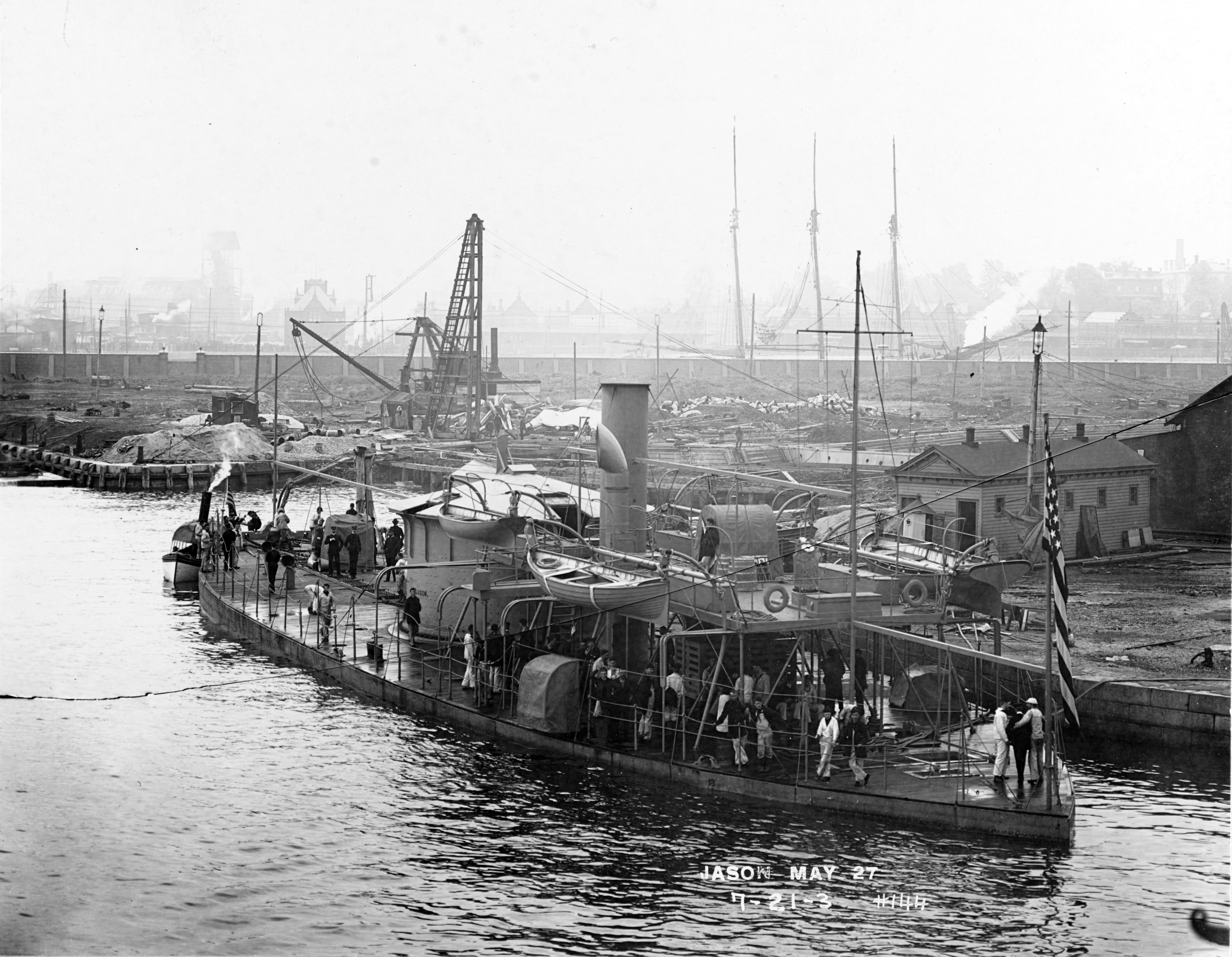
- USS Jason at New York during the Spanish–American War.

History

United States
- Name: USS Sangamon
- Builder: Reaney, Son & Archbold
- Laid down: 1862
- Launched: September 9, 1862
- Commissioned: February 9, 1863
- Decommissioned: ca. 1865
- Recommissioned: May 13, 1898
- Decommissioned: 1899
- Renamed: USS Jason, 10 June 1869
- Fate: Sold April 1904

General characteristics
- Class & type: Passaic-class ironclad monitor
- Displacement: 1,335 long tons (1,356 t)
- Length: 200 ft (61 m) o/a
- Beam: 46 ft (14 m)
- Draft: 10 ft 6 in (3.20 m)
- Installed power: 320 ihp (240 kW)
- Propulsion: 1 × Ericsson vibrating lever engine; 2 × Martin boilers; 1 × shaft
- Speed: 7 kn (8.1 mph; 13 km/h)
- Complement: 77
- Armament: 1 × 15 in (380 mm) smoothbore gun, 1 × 11 in (280 mm) Dahlgren gun
- Armor: Side: 3–5 in (7.6–12.7 cm); Turret: 11 in (28 cm); Pilothouse: 8 in (20 cm); Deck: 1 in (2.5 cm)
- Notes: Armor is iron.

USS Sangamon was a Passaic-class ironclad monitor constructed for the Union Navy during the second year of the American Civil War where she operated in the waterways of the Confederate States of America. She was later recommissioned and placed into service during the Spanish–American War.

== Construction ==
The first U.S. Navy ship to be so named, Sangamon was built by the shipbuilding firm Reaney, Son & Archbold under the name Conestoga in the summer of 1862; renamed Sangamon on September 9, 1862; launched on October 27, 1862; and commissioned on February 9, 1863, at Chester, Pennsylvania, Commodore Pierce Crosby in command.

=== Assigned to the North Atlantic blockade ===
The monitor was assigned to the North Atlantic Blockading Squadron and soon began efficient but unspectacular operations in Hampton Roads, Virginia and in the many roughly parallel rivers which empty into Chesapeake Bay. Sangamon was one of the vital ships of the Navy which guaranteed the Army control of the waters which border and penetrate the bitterly contested land which separated Washington, D.C., and Richmond, Virginia.

After repairs at Philadelphia, Pennsylvania on February 21, 1864, she was towed by Wachusett to Port Royal, South Carolina for duty with the South Atlantic Blockading Squadron. After Union blockade duty off Charleston, South Carolina, she returned to Hampton Roads in the summer to support General Ulysses S. Grant's drive on Richmond, Virginia.

=== Varied river duties ===
Sangamon performed widely varied duties. She conducted reconnaissance expeditions up the river to obtain information, and often dueled Confederate forces hidden along the banks. She guarded Union troop concentrations and served as part of the Union naval force which patrolled the upper James to prevent the Confederate flotilla from threatening Union transports.

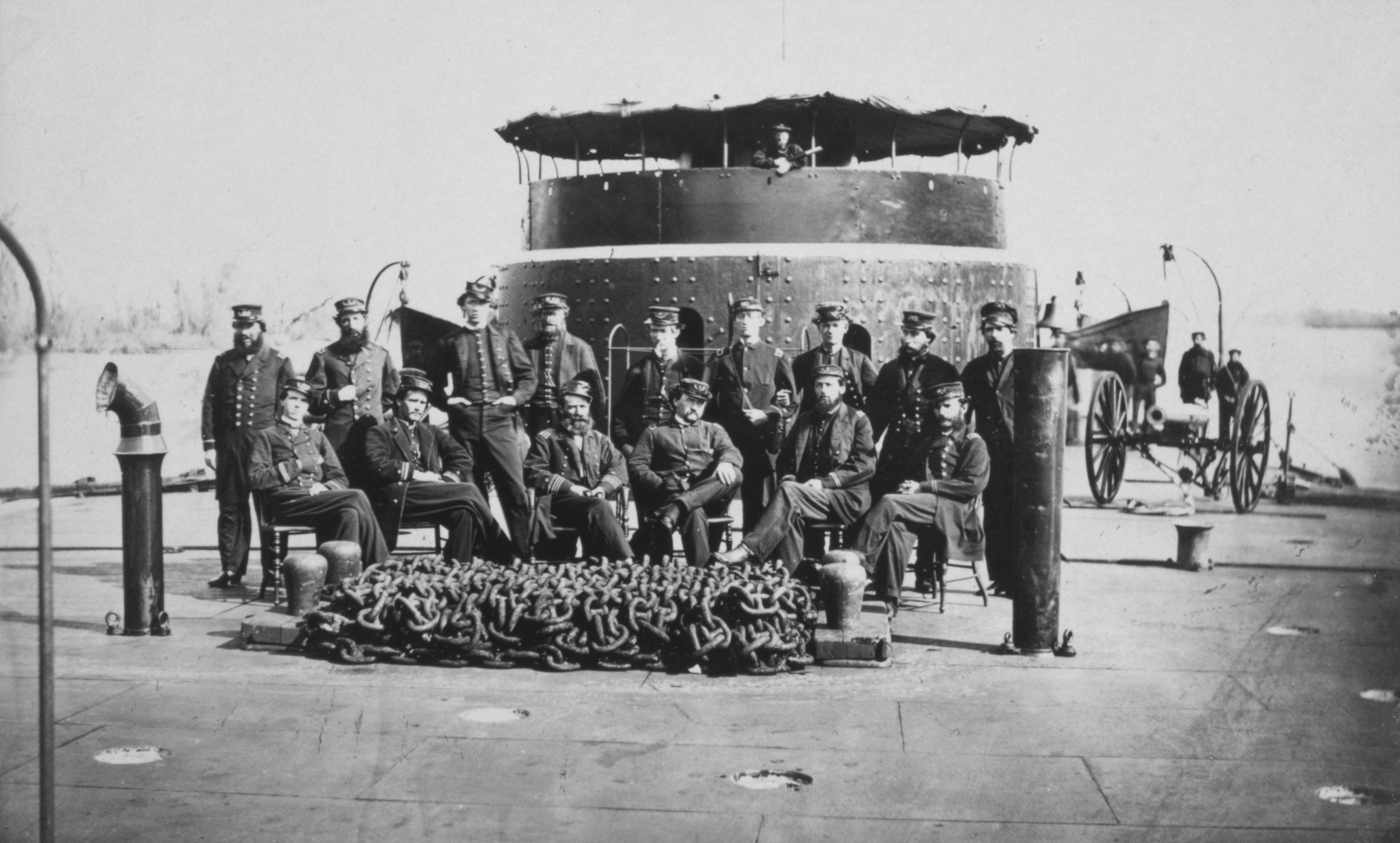
Officers of the Sangamon in the James River, 1865

In March to April 1865, during the final thrust on Richmond, Virginia, she assisted in clearing the river of Confederate torpedoes (mines) and countering the threat of Confederate ironclads so that Union shipping could proceed safely to the Confederate capital. One of her final wartime assignments Sangamon was required to perform, was to accompany the tugboat flotilla towing the previously captured and unfinished Confederate casemate ironclad CSS Texas (1865) to her final destination at the Norfolk Naval Shipyard on May 3, 1865. The overall expedition was led by Sangamon's skipper at the time, Lieutenant Commander R. Chandler.

== Post–Civil War operations ==
After the war ended, Sangamon was decommissioned at Philadelphia and placed in reserve. Renamed Jason on June 10, 1869, no record has been found of any subsequent active service until she was recommissioned on May 13, 1898, for service during the Spanish–American War. The old monitor was stationed at Fisher's Island, Long Island, New York where she provided the New York City area with some degree of naval protection against the perceived threat of a raid by Spanish cruisers.

== Final decommissioning ==
In 1899, she returned to Philadelphia and was placed in reserve at League Island, where she remained until sold in April 1904.

== Sources ==
- This article contains text from the US Naval Historical Center.
- Additional technical data from Gardiner, Robert (1979). Conway's All the World's Fighting Ships 1860–1905. Conway Maritime Press. p. 120. ISBN 0-85177-133-5.
- Wright, Christopher C. (June 2021). "Canonicus at Jamestown, 1907". Warship International. LVIII (2): 126–162. ISSN 0043-0374.
