= John Roach (shipbuilder) =

Irish-American industrialist (1815–1887)

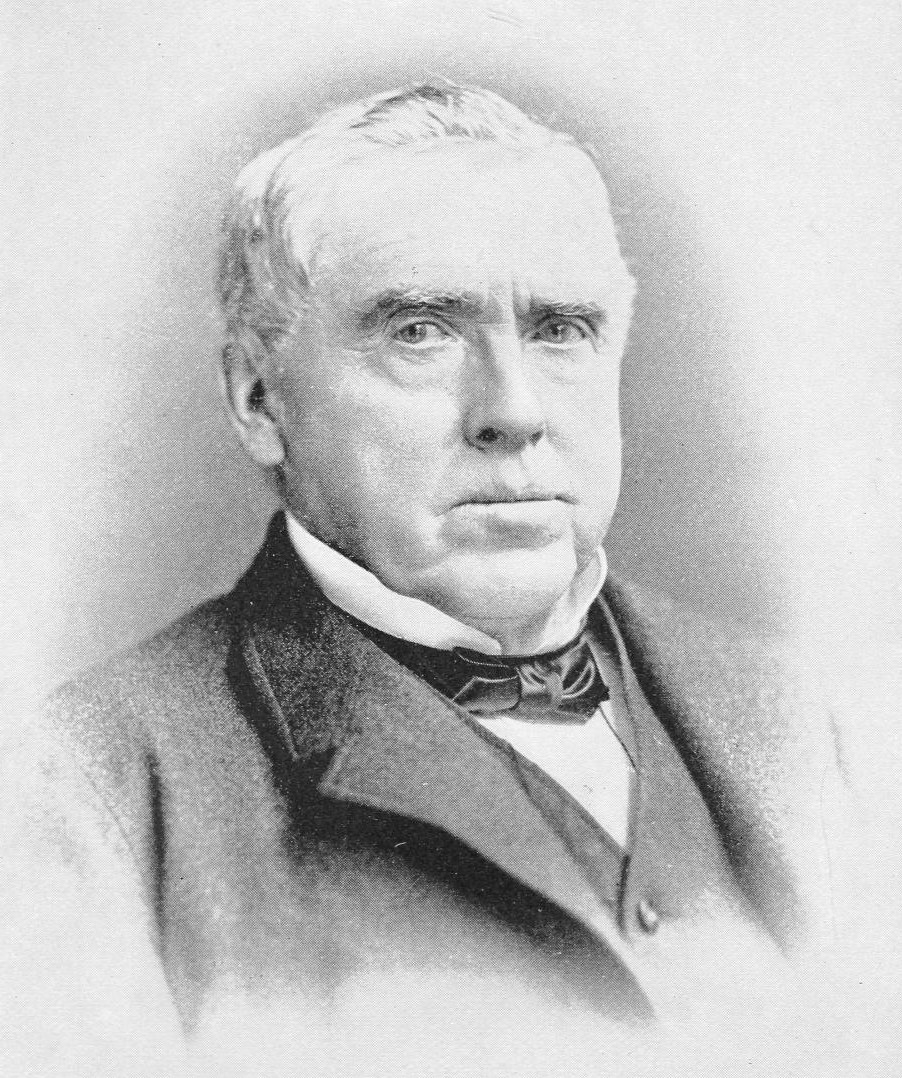
- Born: December 25, 1815; Mitchelstown, Ireland
- Died: January 10, 1887 (aged 71); New York City, US
- Occupations: Shipbuilder, industrialist

John Roach (December 25, 1815 – January 10, 1887) was an American industrialist who found the largest shipbuilding empire in the United States during and after the Reconstruction Era, John Roach & Sons.

Roach emigrated to the United States at the age of sixteen in 1832, eventually finding employment at the Howell Works of James P. Allaire in New Jersey, where he learned the ironmolder's trade. Following an abortive attempt at farming in Illinois in 1839, Roach returned to Allaire's employment at the Allaire Iron Works in New York City, where he learned how to build marine steam engines. In 1852, after 20 years in the employment of Allaire, Roach and three partners purchased a small New York ironworks which had fallen into receivership, the Etna Iron Works. Roach soon became sole proprietor, and during the American Civil War transformed the Etna Works into a major manufacturer of marine engines. He continued to prosper after the war, diversifying into the manufacture of machine tools and buying out his main engine-building competitors in the postwar slump. In 1867 he purchased the Morgan Iron Works on New York's East River, and relocated his business there.

In 1871, Roach purchased the shipyard in Chester, Pennsylvania of Reaney, Son & Archbold, which had fallen into receivership, and renamed it the Delaware River Iron Ship Building and Engine Works, which thereafter became his main facility. In the next few years he founded a network of new companies in Chester to support the shipyard's operations, including the Chester Rolling Mill, the Chester Pipe and Tube Company, the Hirsch Propeller Company, the Chalmers-Spence asbestos company, and later the Combination Steel and Iron Company and the Standard Steel Casting Company. To give his sons a stake in the business, Roach founded the firm of John Roach & Sons, which became the overall parent and marketing company. He also attempted to create his own shipping line with the establishment of the United States and Brazil Mail Steamship Company, but this latter venture was a costly failure.

From 1871 until 1885, John Roach & Sons was easily the largest and most productive shipbuilding firm in the United States, building more tonnage of ships than its next two chief competitors combined. In the mid-1880s the firm ran into trouble with a series of U.S. Navy contracts which became the subject of political controversy. Roach had signed the contracts under a Republican administration, but when the Democratic administration of Grover Cleveland came to power, it voided one of the contracts. Doubts over the validity of the remaining three contracts made it impossible for John Roach & Sons to obtain loans, and in 1885 the Roach shipbuilding empire was forced into receivership. John Roach died at his home in New York at the age of 71 on January 10, 1887, while his firm was still in the hands of the receivers. After settling all the company's debts, his sons found themselves still in possession of the Delaware River Iron Shipbuilding Works in Chester and the Morgan Iron Works in New York, and they resumed the business, which was continued for another 20 years, although the firm never regained the preeminent position it had enjoyed under Roach Sr.'s leadership.

== Early life and career ==
John Roach was born on December 25, 1815, at Mitchelstown, County Cork, Ireland, the first of seven children to Patrick Roche, a retail salesman, and his wife Abigail Meany. The Roche family traced its origins back to Godebert de Rupe, a major landholder in Cork in the twelfth century. Roach's father Patrick made a modest living by collecting produce from the region's farmers to sell in the local township, and by purchasing the farmers' needs while in town.

John Roach received only a rudimentary education, and went to work at the age of thirteen after his father Patrick fell on hard times. Patrick died in 1831, and John was unable to find enough work to support the family. Around the same time, an uncle who had emigrated to the United States sent money for his two sons to join him, but their mother would allow only one to go, offering the second fare to Roach instead, who accepted it.

In 1832, at the age of sixteen, Roach emigrated together with his cousin to the United States. Arriving in New York City, he was at first unable to find regular work, but eventually gained secure employment at the Howell Works of James P. Allaire on the recommendation of a former employee of his father.

=== Howell Works ===
Howell Works Company logo, showing the main furnace building

Roach began his employment at the Howell Works as a common laborer at 25c a day, collecting bricks and conveying them in a wheelbarrow to various building sites around the company grounds. Concerned about the potential ill effects of the brick dust on his health, he soon decided to improve his situation by learning the iron molder's trade.

At the time, the firm's proprietor, James P. Allaire, charged an entry fee of sixty dollars for an apprenticeship, but impressed by Roach's dedication, he decided to waive the fee. This created some resentment on the part of the established iron molders, who at first disdained to teach Roach their skills, subjecting him to various forms of humiliation instead. When Allaire heard of their treatment, he personally visited the molding floor and addressed the gathered tradesmen: "You see this boy—it is my wish that he should learn the trade—see to it that my wishes are not further disregarded." Roach was thereafter taught the trade, eventually becoming a highly skilled iron molder.

=== Attempt at farming ===
In 1837, the Howell Works' blast furnace exploded, bringing production to a standstill, and because of the financial panic which occurred the same year, Allaire was unable to raise the funds to fully repair it for two years. Although the Howell Works was self-sufficient in food, Roach decided upon a change in career after a colleague encouraged him to take up farming in Illinois.

In 1838, Roach set out with $500 in savings to make a down payment on a farm in Peoria, Illinois, planning to send for his wife when the transaction had been concluded. His 28-day journey began with an 85-mile train leg, followed by transfer to a canal boat which in the course of its 385-mile route had to pass through no less than 176 locks. At the Allegheny Mountains, the boat was actually lifted in sections over the mountain on steam-driven cable cars before resuming its journey. The final leg of the journey was completed on a Mississippi riverboat.

Once in Illinois, Roach was dismayed to discover that so complete was the isolation of the region that corn served not only as the staple foodstuff, but also as the principal source of heating and even as the local currency. He nevertheless made a down payment on the farm, but his plans were dashed when he received news from his wife that the couple's remaining savings had been lost in some kind of financial failure. Roach was forced to forfeit the farm, and with no remaining money took several months to work his way back to New Jersey.

While his farming venture had ended in failure, Roach learned much from the experience, including the vital importance of transport and proximity to markets. "I came to the conclusion then", he was later to write, "that it was better to own an acre or two of land where there was a railroad, and where you could get something for what you raised on your land, than to own the whole of Illinois without means of transportation." These were lessons he would apply to his own business model in later life.

== Later career ==
=== Etna Iron Works ===
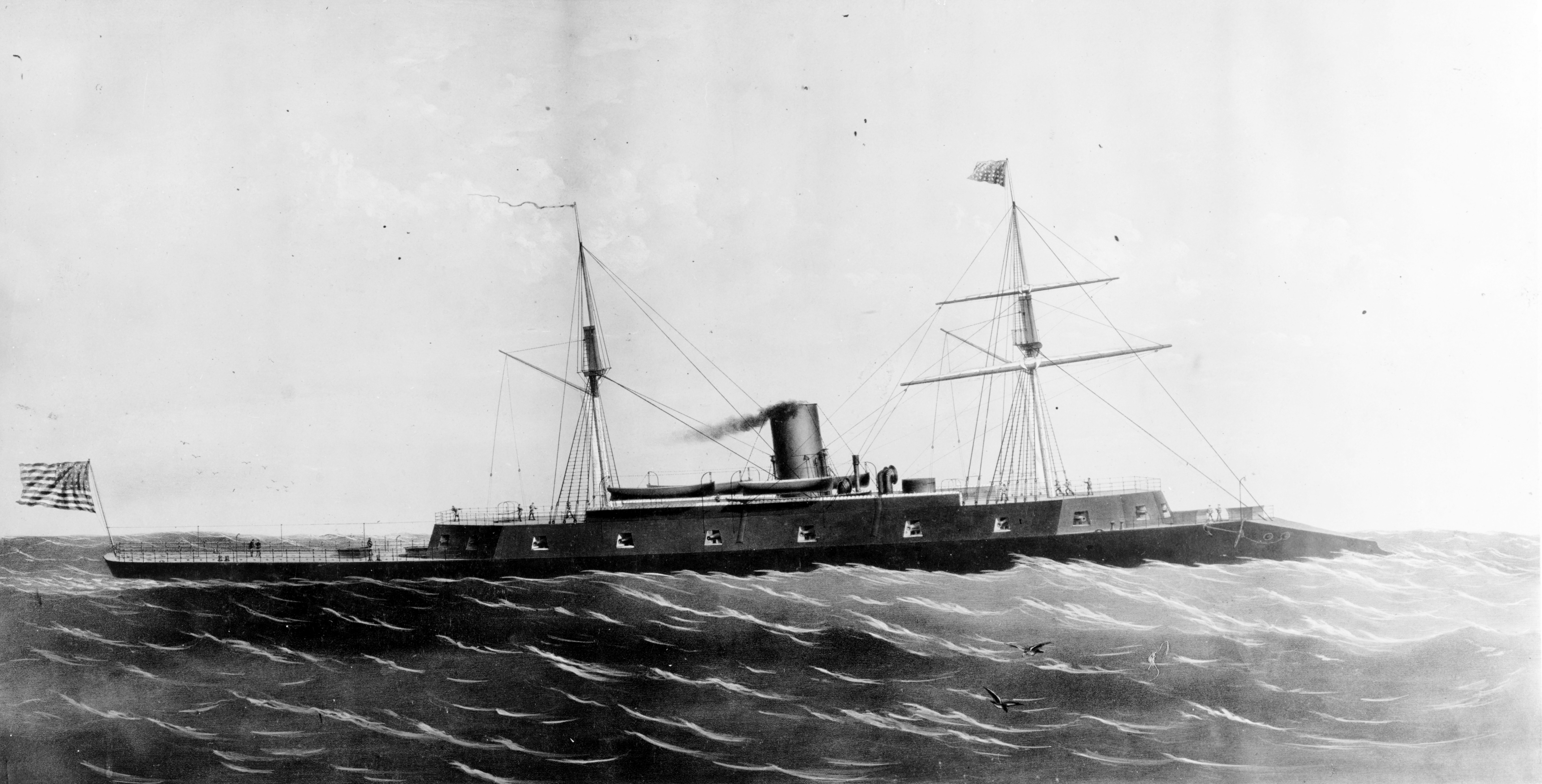
Engines for the mammoth ironclad USS Dunderberg and a number of other warships were supplied by the Etna Iron Works during the American Civil War.

After returning to his wife in New Jersey, Roach resumed employment with James Allaire, but this time at the latter's engine building plant, the Allaire Iron Works in New York City. During his twelve years at the plant, Roach applied himself to learning everything he could about the manufacture of marine steam engines.

In 1852, Roach, by now 37 years of age, joined with three other ironmolders, including his brother-in-law Joseph Johnston who had $8,000 in savings (equivalent to $310,000 in 2025), to purchase a small New York ironworks which had fallen into receivership, the Etna Iron Works. Roach was given the task of touting for business while his three partners attended to production on the shop floor.

After its first year of operations, the business had made a modest $1000 ($39,000) profit, but now a dispute arose as Roach wanted to invest the money in expanding the plant while his three partners preferred to split the money into dividends of $250 ($10,000) each. Realizing they had reached the limit of their ambition, Roach secured a mortgage on the property and bought his partners out, making himself sole proprietor. In a three-month period, he made a profit of $8,000 from sales of iron castings to local shipyards, giving his new company a solid foundation.

By 1859, the Etna Works employed 40 people, and in that year the company received a windfall capital injection when a lawyer friend named John Baker died and left Roach trustee over his $70,000 ($2,510,000) estate, enabling Roach to expand his business further. When the American Civil War broke out in 1861, Roach was in a position to take advantage of high demand by converting his plant into a manufacturer of marine steam engines. At its wartime peak, the Etna Works employed 2,000 people, and by the war's end it had become a leader in the industry.

=== Morgan Iron Works ===
In the aftermath of the war, the U.S. government dumped more than a million tons of surplus shipping onto the market, depressing prices and leaving shipyards and marine engine builders with little or no work. From 1865 to 1870, many shipyards and engine builders were driven to bankruptcy.

Roach, however, managed to prosper in this difficult period by diversifying into the manufacture of machine tools, and selling them to the U.S. Navy which was in the process of upgrading the facilities of its own shipyards. He secured almost a million dollars' worth of such contracts between 1866 and 1868, and was thus able to buy out most of his competitors. In 1867 he purchased the Morgan Iron Works and relocated his business there, retaining the Etna Works only as a rental property. The Morgan Works, with its ideal location on New York's East River, would remain a key part of the Roach business empire for the next four decades.

=== Chester shipyard ===
Roach had observed that Great Britain was steadily replacing its fleet of wooden-hulled sidewheel steamers with modern iron-hulled, screw-driven steamships. Anticipating a similar trend in the United States, he decided to establish an iron shipbuilding facility of his own.

In 1871, he purchased the shipyard of Reaney, Son & Archbold in Chester, Pennsylvania, which had fallen into receivership. Roach renamed the yard the Delaware River Iron Ship Building and Engine Works and invested heavily in expanding its facilities. To support its operations, he established a network of companies in Chester, including the Chester Rolling Mill, which supplied iron hull plates and beams to the yard, the Chester Pipe and Tube Company, for supplying boiler pipes and other ships' piping, the Chalmers-Spence Company, which supplied asbestos insulation for the steam pipes, and the Hirsch Propeller Company. He would later establish the Combination Steel and Iron Company for the production of iron and steel castings, and the Standard Steel Casting Company for the production of steel ingots, both of which firms would soon be engaged in producing steel for the shipyard.

This network of vertically integrated companies enabled Roach to largely eliminate third-party suppliers, cutting costs and thus allowing him to regularly underbid competitors. He quickly established himself as the nation's leading iron shipbuilder, building more tonnage of ships in most years than the aggregate output of his next two major competitors, Harlan & Hollingsworth and William Cramp & Sons.

=== U.S. and Brazil Mail Steamship Company ===
Roach was not content with simply owning the largest shipbuilding empire in the United States. He had visions of transforming John Roach & Sons into a vast global transportation empire, and as the first step toward this goal, he established the United States and Brazil Mail Steamship Company in 1876 to operate a shipping line between the United States and Brazil. At this time, British shipping companies operated a highly lucrative "triangular trade" from Britain to Brazil to the U.S. and back to Britain which allowed them a near-monopoly on Brazilian imports. Roach hoped to break into the Brazilian import market with his new shipping line, but lacking the funds to engage in a prolonged trade war, intended to rely on subsidies from the American and Brazilian governments to support his venture.

The U.S. and Brazil Mail Company was launched with great fanfare, with President Rutherford B. Hayes and many members of Congress attending the launch of one of the company's first ships. To Roach's dismay however, both the Brazilian and U.S. governments ultimately rejected his application for subsidies, and his Brazil Mail company struggled on for a number of years before eventually failing. Roach lost almost a million dollars ($30,000,000) in his Brazilian shipping line venture, leading to a shortage of operating capital for his business empire that would eventually contribute to its financial failure.

== Political controversies ==
As a result of his business dealings, Roach found himself involved in a number of political controversies during the course of his career, as business competitors and political opponents alike sought to malign his reputation. He also attracted criticism as a consequence of his subsidy campaigns.

A staunch Republican and generous donor to the Republican Party, Roach enjoyed the patronage of successive Republican administrations, but the Democrats continued to suspect him of obtaining government contracts not through merit but from favoritism and jobbery with a corrupt Navy Department. While Roach may indeed have benefited from a degree of favoritism under Republican administrations, no credible evidence was ever presented to substantiate the allegations of corruption made against him, and indeed his ability to regularly undercut his competitors sometimes saved the government considerable sums of money. Suspicions persisted however, and when the Democratic administration of Grover Cleveland assumed office, it repudiated a partly completed set of government contracts with Roach, driving the Roach shipyard into receivership.

=== Machine tools ===
The first substantial political controversy in which Roach was engaged arose from his sale of surplus machine tools from the Etna Iron Works to the Philadelphia Navy Yard in 1867. This sale raised the ire of two specialist Philadelphian machine tool manufacturers, William Sellers & Co. and Bement and Dougherty, both of whom had expected to be awarded the contract themselves. The two firms contacted their Congressional representative, William D. Kelley, who quickly raised the matter in Congress on behalf of his constituents. Kelley was appointed chairman of a subcommittee to investigate the Roach contract. In support of claims that the contract had been awarded as a result of political favoritism, Kelley produced two compliant experts who were prepared to testify against the quality of Roach's tools.

The investigation soon drew the attention of the Navy's Bureau of Steam Engineering, Benjamin Isherwood, who appointed a board which took evidence from 25 independent experts on the quality of Roach's machine tools, and which unanimously repudiated the findings of the Kelley report. At this point the controversy should have ended in favor of Roach but now a staunch opponent of Isherwood's engineering department, Vice-Admiral David Dixon Porter, decided to use it as a means of discrediting Isherwood. Payments to Roach were suspended while the political battle continued for over a year, threatening Roach with bankruptcy. Finally however, the Navy agreed to accept the tools already received and to pay Roach $86,000 for release from the rest of the contract.

Roach realized the importance of political influence during this period, and secured the services of lawyer William E. Chandler who became his chief Washington lobbyist. Roach also became a generous donor to the Republican Party.

=== USS Tennessee ===
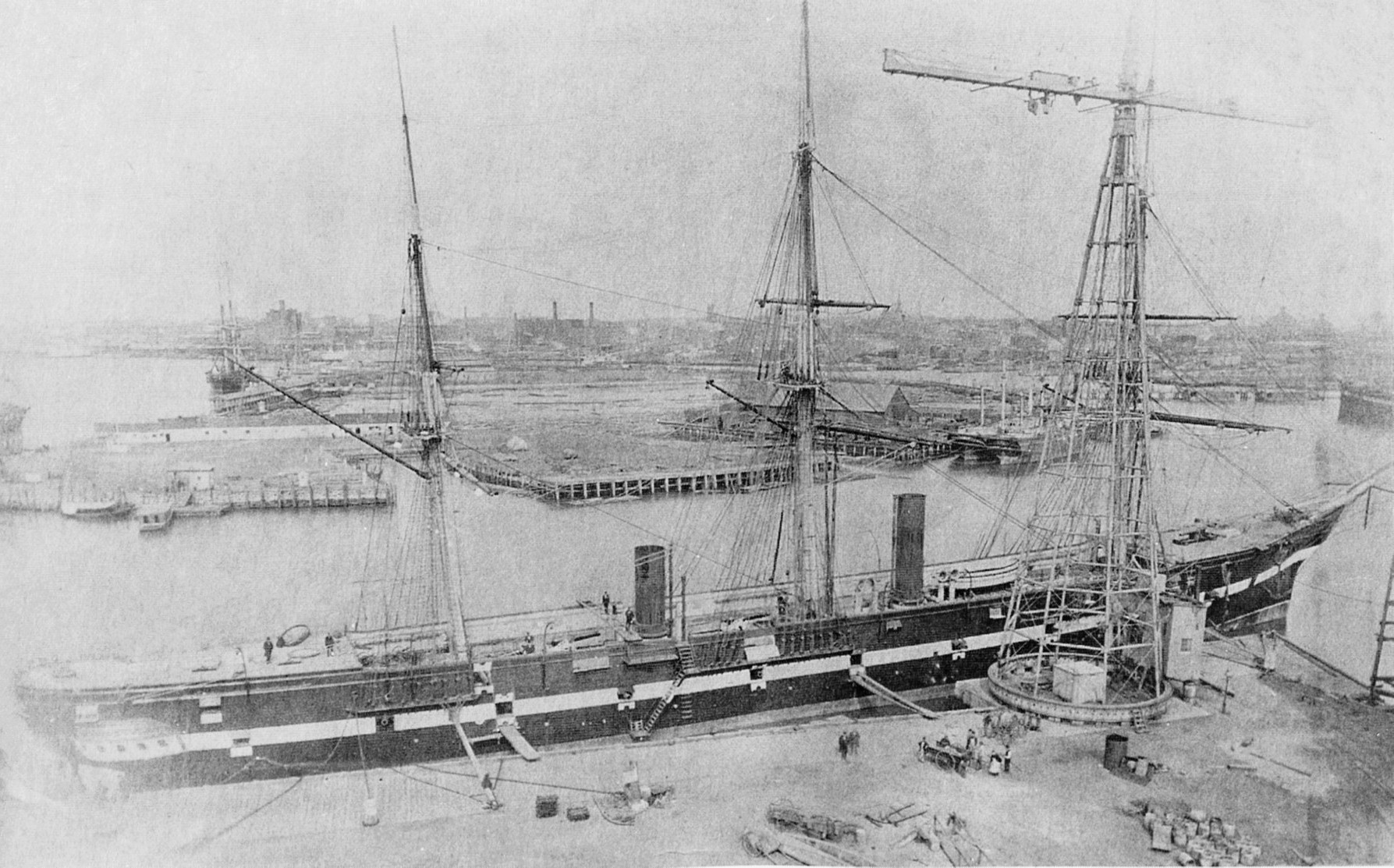
The experimental screw frigate USS Tennessee. Roach's engine refit for this vessel led to allegations of corruption.

In August 1871, Roach submitted a proposal to the U.S. Navy for refitting several warships with compound engines, asserting that the new engines would save space and reduce running costs by as much as 40%. The Navy agreed to an experimental engine refit for one vessel, USS Tennessee, for which Roach would receive $300,000 for two compound engines plus the ship's original engines for their scrap value.

In February 1872, the editor of New York's The Sun newspaper, Charles Dana, initiated an editorial campaign against Secretary of the Navy George M. Robeson, accusing him of receiving kickbacks from companies in return for favoring them with Navy contracts. Dana alleged that Roach had corruptly received from Robeson the excessive sum of $700,000 to refit the Tennessee—$300,000 for the new engines plus a $400,000 scrap value for the old. In an extraordinary step, Congress consented to Dana's demand that he personally be given the power to cross-examine witnesses in a Congressional inquiry into the allegations.

Dana was able to establish evidence of corruption in Robeson's case, but he failed to demonstrate any such evidence against Roach. Dana's initial estimate of a $400,000 scrap value for Tennessee's old engines had been provided by former Navy Bureau Chief Benjamin Isherwood, but under oath Isherwood retracted his earlier estimate and submitted a new estimate of $175,000. This estimate was also incorrect however—in fact, the scrap value of Tennessee's old machinery was only $38,000 after subtracting the cost of removing it from the ship. Roach was actually doing the job cheaper than for a similar contract he had recently completed for a private client.

In spite of the lack of evidence, Dana never retracted the charges of corruption he had levelled against Roach in the pages of The Sun. Roach's name had become tainted by his association with Robeson, and Democrats in particular continued to suspect him of receiving favorable treatment from successive Republican administrations.

=== Pacific Mail subsidy ===
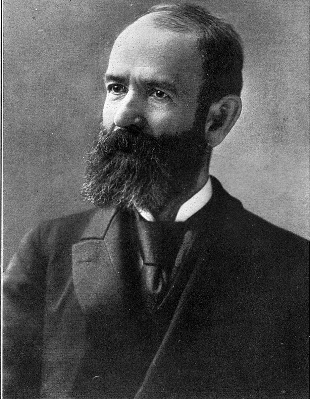
As part of his campaign to gain control of Pacific Mail, Jay Gould vilified Roach as an inefficient shipbuilder dependent upon government subsidies.

Shortly after opening his Chester shipyard, Roach received a large contract from the Pacific Mail Steamship Company for the construction of seven modern iron-hulled, screw-propelled steamships to replace their ageing fleet of wooden-hulled sidewheel steamers. Roach quickly began work on the contract, but in 1873, Pacific Mail confessed an inability to meet its obligations after the company's managing director squandered its capital reserves with a failed stock manipulation scheme and then absconded with a large amount of cash.

Roach was put in a difficult position as he still had several Pacific Mail ships in an uncompleted state on his slipways with an aggregate value in excess of $500,000. The situation was made worse when stock speculator Jay Gould, in an attempt to gain control of Pacific Mail by driving down its share price, lobbied Congress to cancel the $500,000 subsidy it had earlier granted to the company. Fearing that loss of the subsidy would bankrupt Pacific Mail, Roach instructed his own lobbyist, William Chandler, to organize a counter-campaign. Unknown to Roach however, Chandler also had Gould as a client, making Chandler reluctant to take any action which might lose him Gould's patronage. Gould's campaign was ultimately successful, and Congress cancelled the Pacific Mail subsidy. Fortunately, Pacific Mail survived the financial crisis, but Roach was again maligned in Congress, this time by Gould's opportunistic extension of earlier attacks on Roach portraying him as an unethical businessman supposedly surviving only as a result of political favoritism and government subsidies.

=== USS Puritan ===
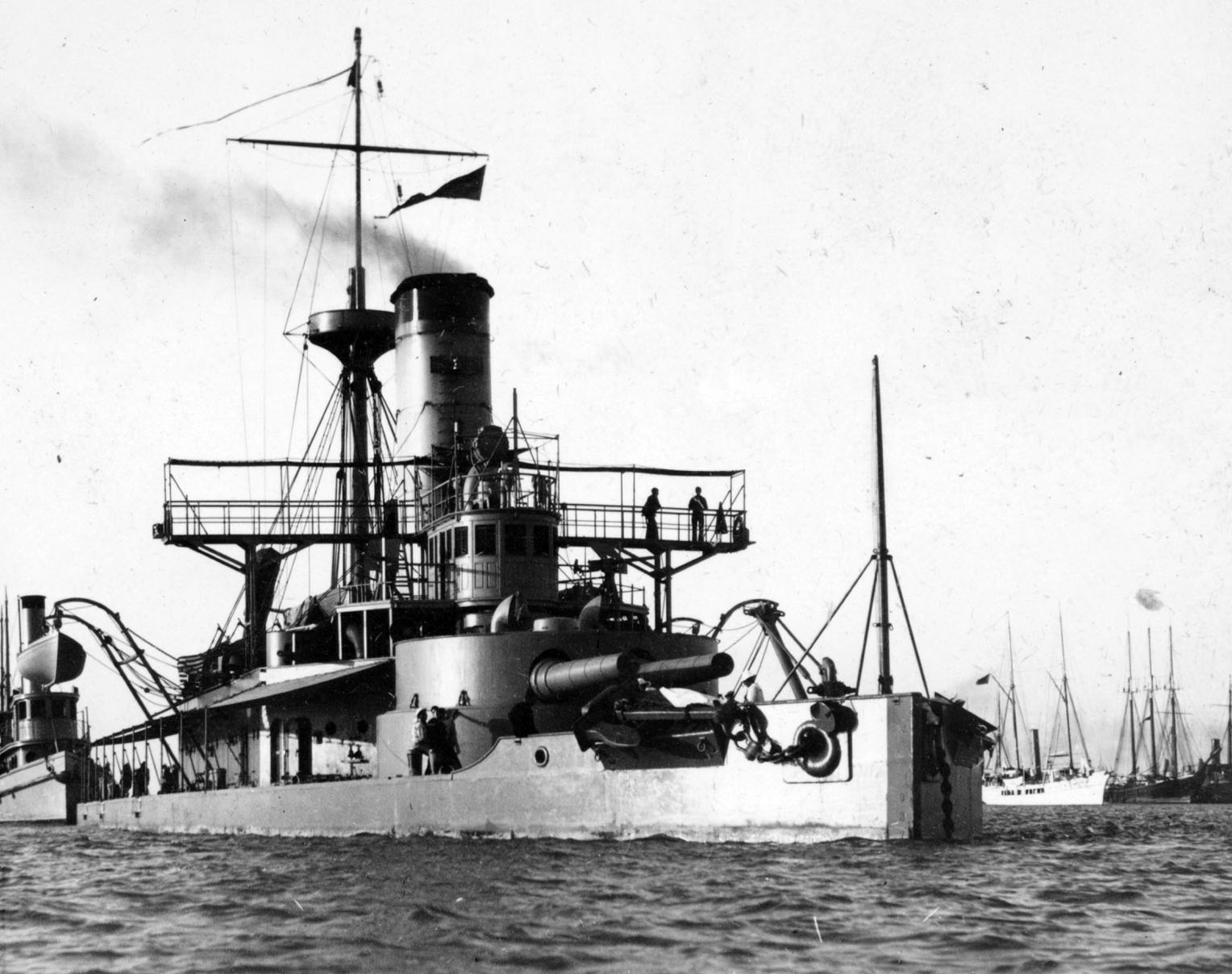
USS Puritan (BM-1) in 1898. Roach was accused of securing the contract for this ship through political favoritism.

In 1873, the Virginius war scare with Spain prompted Secretary of the Navy George Robeson to order a new class of five monitors to protect America's ports. Two of these monitors—USS Puritan and USS Miantonomoh—were contracted for with John Roach & Sons. Robeson soon ran out of money to pay for the monitors, and in 1876 was obliged to ask Congress for an additional $2,300,000 to complete them. Two days before leaving office, he gave orders for completion of the monitors and at the same time awarded a further $997,000 contract to Roach for the addition of armored belts and turrets to Puritan.

When the new Secretary of the Navy, Richard W. Thompson, assumed office, he appointed an ad hoc naval board to review the monitor contracts. The board concluded that the work Roach had done on Puritan was first-class, and that the price of the contracts had been reasonable; however, it averred that the extra weight of the armored belts would render the ship unseaworthy. Roach scoffed at the latter conclusion, but two further naval inquiries confirmed the findings of the first, as a result of which the government refused to honor the contracts.

The Puritan controversy revived the attacks on Roach alleging favoritism and jobbery, and he was forced to keep the uncompleted vessel in his shipyard at his own expense for the next five years. Only in 1882 did Congress finally approve completion of the ship, whose eventual performance would prove the conclusions of the earlier inquiries wrong.

=== Brazil Line subsidy ===
In 1875, C. K. Garrison's United States and Brazil Mail Steamship Company went bankrupt. The following year, Roach decided to revive the company, believing that with the deployment of modern iron-hulled, screw-propelled steamships, he could succeed where the Garrison-run operation had failed.

Roach fully expected to receive a subsidy from the government to help him run the line, since the Garrison company had enjoyed a U.S. government subsidy worth $150,000 annually. Nevertheless, he launched his new Brazil Line with great fanfare, inviting President Rutherford B. Hayes and the entire U.S. Congress to the launch of one of the Line's first ships, and lobbying hard for the subsidy. Unfortunately, his high-profile campaign had the opposite effect to that intended, as a host of entrenched interest groups—including Bostonian sailing ship owners and merchants, free traders, and competitors in the shipbuilding industry—joined forces to oppose it. In 1879 the proposed subsidy bill was struck down in Congress.

Forced to compete with subsidized British shipping lines for the Brazil trade without a subsidy of its own, Roach's Brazil Line steadily lost money. In May 1881, Roach wound up the company. His losses in the venture amounted to almost a million dollars, leading to a shortage of operating capital that would eventually contribute to the bankruptcy of his business empire.

=== USS Dolphin ===
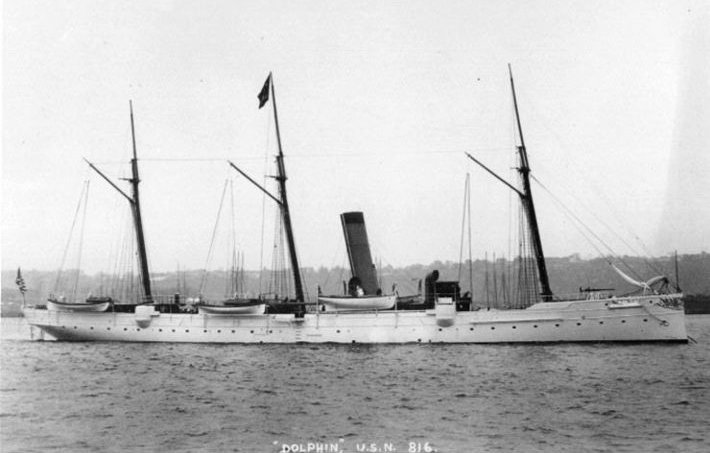
USS Dolphin. The Cleveland administration's voiding of the contract for this vessel forced John Roach & Sons into receivership.

In 1881, William H. Hunt was appointed Secretary of the Navy by the new administration of James A. Garfield. Hunt conducted a review and found that the Navy at this time comprised a mere 52 seaworthy vessels, only 17 of which were iron-hulled, including 14 dated Civil-War era ironclads. Appalled at the Navy's dilapidated condition, he appointed an advisory board in June 1881 to look into the problem, which made some recommendations concerning the desirable qualities for a new generation of warships. Congress subsequently created a Naval Advisory Board to make more definitive recommendations, and in December 1882 the Board recommended the construction of four new warships to comprise the "nucleus of the New Navy"—three protected cruisers and one dispatch vessel. These would be the Navy's first steel warships.

Since the Navy's own yards lacked the facilities to build the new ships, the four contracts were tendered to the private sector. On July 2, 1883, it was announced that John Roach & Sons had won all four contracts with an aggregate bid $315,000 lower than the next lowest bidder, William Cramp & Sons. Charles Cramp would later declare it impossible to build the ships at the prices tendered by Roach, but with his own steel mills, Roach could save $275,000 on the cost of the steel alone. His success in winning all four bids was however to revive the old charges of favoritism.

Shortly after Roach began building the new vessels, their design, authored by the Naval Advisory Board, came under scathing attack in the prestigious British engineering journal The Engineer. Editor of The Sun, Charles Dana, seized upon this article to renew the attack upon Roach, and the various faction-ridden departments in the U.S. Navy began to circulate their own criticisms. Soon the ships were being denigrated by press and politicians alike as "costly toy[s]", "egregious failures" and "comic naval architecture." The Navy began submitting an increasing number of design changes to Roach, leading to mounting cost overruns, and construction was further delayed by a nationwide shortage of the high quality steel the Navy demanded.

By the time the first ship to be completed, Dolphin, was ready for her final sea trials in early 1885, a new Democratic administration under Grover Cleveland had come to power. In spite of Dolphin passing her sea trials, the new administration, for whom Roach had become a symbol of Republican corruption, found a pretext to declare the Dolphin contract void. Roach, by now a terminally ill old man, placed his company into receivership a short time later. He later explained that with over $500,000 tied up in the four uncompleted U.S. Navy ships, whose contracts might be declared void at any time, he was unable to raise the necessary loans to continue in business.

Thomas Edison, a business acquaintance of Roach, probably encapsulated the feelings of many Roach supporters regarding the Dolphin affair with an entry in his diary:

... Read Sunday Herald, learned about Roach's failure. Am sorry. He has been pursued with great malignity by newspapers and others, from ignorance I think. Americans ought to be proud of Roach, who started in life as a day laborer and became the giant of industry and the greatest shipbuilder in the United States ... What has he now for forty years of incessant work and worry? For people who hound such men as these I would invent a special Hades ...

In spite of the heavy criticism initially levelled at them from many different quarters, the completion of the four ABCD ships—the Navy's first steel vessels—was later hailed as the "Birth of the New Navy", and all four vessels were to provide many years of reliable service.

== Death and legacy ==
During the protracted dispute over Dolphin, Roach had fallen ill with a chronic mouth infection. In 1886, the illness was diagnosed as cancer. Roach underwent surgery in spring of that year but it provided only temporary relief. He died at the age of 71 on January 10, 1887, while his business was still in the hands of receivers. At his funeral, held at St. Paul's Methodist Episcopal Church on Fourth Ave. and Twenty-second St., 500 mourners filled the galleries alone, many of them employees of John Roach & Sons who demonstrated a "real affection" for their late employer.

Following Roach's death and the settlement of all the company's debts, Roach's heirs found themselves still in possession of both the Chester shipyard and the Morgan Iron Works. Roach's eldest son John Baker Roach assumed head of the business, which would continue for another 20 years, although the yard would never again regain the pre-eminent position in American shipbuilding that it had enjoyed under Roach Sr.

In total, the shipyard established by Roach built 179 iron ships between 1871 and 1907—98 under Roach's own management and an additional 81 under that of his eldest surviving son, John Baker Roach. At its peak, Roach's business empire is said to have been the nation's largest employer with the exception of the railroad companies. After the retirement of the Roach family from the shipbuilding business, the Roach yard was taken over by W. Averell Harriman, who built an additional 40 ships there for the U.S. Shipping Board during and after World War I.

== Personal life ==
Roach married Emeline Johnson—sister of the Howell Works foreman, later Roach's business partner, Joseph Johnson—at James Allaire's mansion on the Howell Works property in 1836. The couple had nine children, three of whom, Garrett, James and Stephen, died in childhood. The others were William Henry, John Baker, Garrett 2d and Stephen 2d—all of whom followed Roach Sr. into the family business—and Sarah and Emeline. In 1898 Emeline Roach married William Cameron Sproul who would become the 27th Governor of Pennsylvania. Roach was survived by his wife, to whom he left a $5,000 annuity, and all his adult children except William.
