= Reaney, Son & Archbold =

American iron shipbuilding company

- Company type: Defunct (1871)
- Industry: Manufacturing
- Founded: 1859
- Successor: Delaware River Iron Ship Building and Engine Works
- Headquarters: Chester, Pennsylvania, United States
- Products: Iron ships, steam engines, other iron products
- Total assets: $1,000,000 (1859)
- Owner: Thomas Reany, William B. Reaney, Samuel Archbold

Reaney, Son & Archbold was a 19th-century American iron shipbuilding company located on the Delaware River at Chester, Pennsylvania. The company was established in 1859 by Thomas Reaney (formerly of the firm Reaney, Neafie & Levy) but it was undercapitalized from the outset, and like many other American shipbuilding companies, fell victim to the shipbuilding slump that followed the American Civil War.

Notable ships built by the company included the Passaic class monitors USS Sangamon and USS Lehigh, and the Casco class monitor USS Tunxis. It also built the sidewheel steamer Samuel M. Felton, which was the fastest ship on the Philadelphia-Wilmington route for some years.

After the yard went into receivership in 1871, it was purchased by John Roach, who transformed it into the Delaware River Iron Shipbuilding and Engine Works which became America's largest, most modern and most productive shipyard from the 1870s through the mid-1880s.

== Origins ==
In 1844, three mechanics, Thomas Reaney, Jacob Neafie and William Smith, established the Penn Works in Philadelphia for the manufacture of steam engines and other products. The Works, which eventually became known as Reaney, Neafie & Levy, soon added shipbuilding to its product line.

After fifteen years with the company, during which time he acquired experience in the building of both iron and wooden ships, Thomas Reaney decided to establish a shipyard of his own in partnership with his son, William B. Reaney. Selling his share of Reaney, Neafie & Levy to the other two partners (who renamed it Neafie & Levy) Thomas Reaney purchased the property of the Pennsylvania Oil Works at Chester, Pennsylvania, whose plant had recently been destroyed by fire. With its 1,200 feet of frontage along the Delaware River, at a point where the River was a mile wide and 21 feet deep, the property was an ideal location for a shipyard. Reaney named his new company Reaney & Son, and spent about a million dollars outfitting the yard for iron shipbuilding. The yard was thereby very well equipped, but the large expenditure on plant and machinery was to leave the company chronically short of cash.

The yard's first vessel, a tugboat, was launched in 1861, and in the same year the firm was joined by Samuel Archbold, former Chief Engineer with the U.S. Navy, who brought with him useful connections to government. With Archbold's partnership, the firm was renamed Reaney, Son & Archbold.

== American Civil War ==
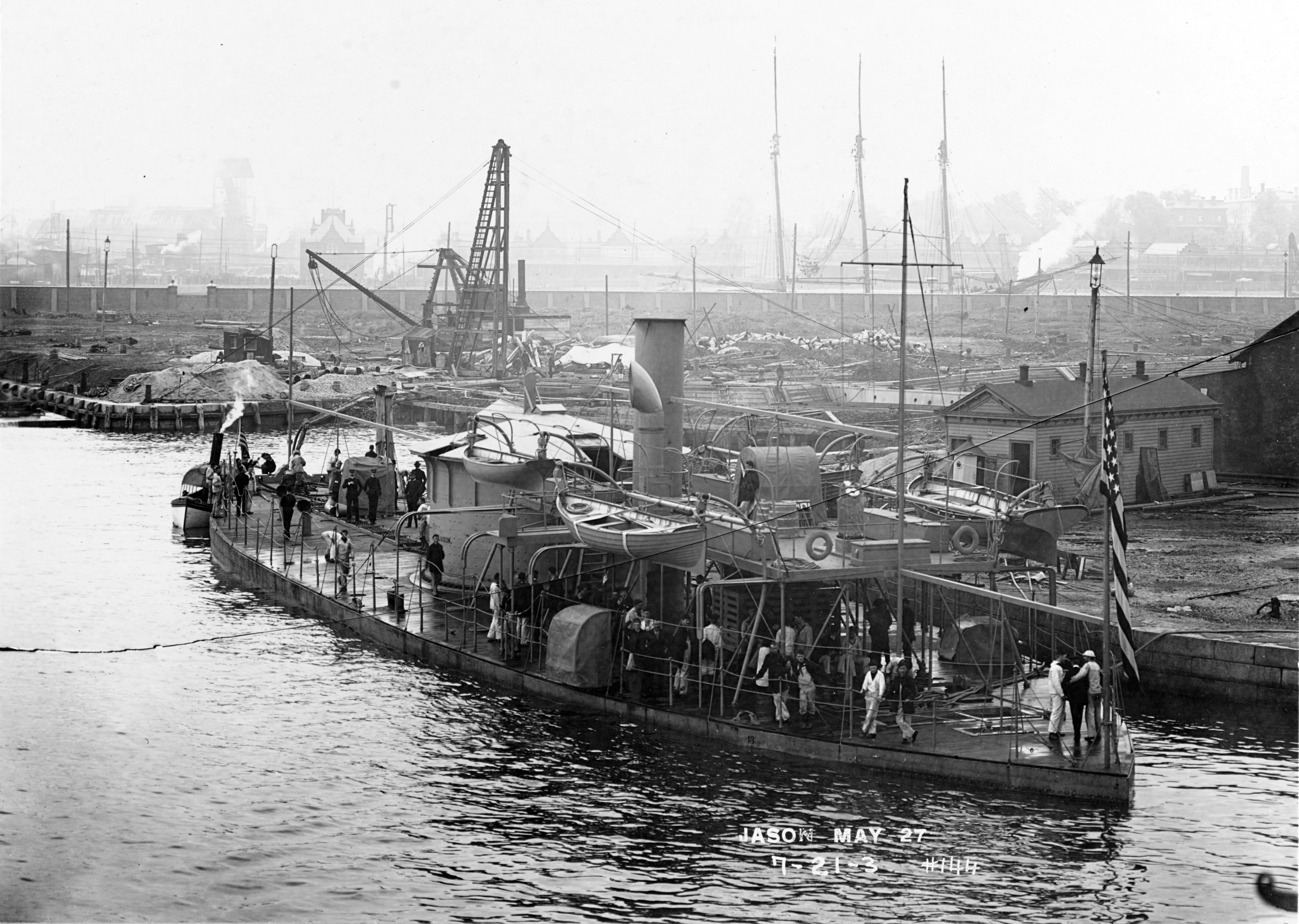
USS Sangamon, an ironclad built in 1863 by Reaney, Son & Archbold

The first few vessels built by Reaney, Son & Archbold were mainly tugboats and barges, in addition to which it built a number of general purpose steam engines. With the outbreak of the Civil War however, the company had an opportunity to secure more substantial contracts. In May 1862, the yard secured contracts from the U.S. Navy to build the hulls for two of the new Passaic class monitors, USS Sangamon and USS Lehigh, although the Navy contracted the engines to another firm.

The heavy armor plates required to build the two monitors forced the company to upgrade its ironworking facilities, leaving it with as little as $25,000 to $30,000 in working capital. The shortage of capital may have contributed to the fact that, of all the companies contracted to build Passaic class monitors, Reaney, Son & Archbold was the last to make delivery, which was achieved respectively in February and April 1863. With a displacement of 1,875 tons apiece, these would be the two largest-tonnage vessels ever built by the company.

Reaney, Son & Archbold built a number of other warships for the Navy during the war, including the 1,370-ton gunboats USS Suwanee and USS Shamokin and the 974-ton gunboat USS Wateree. It was also contracted to build one of the ill-fated Casco class light draft monitors, the USS Tunxis. In the case of the latter, the company was amongst the first to deliver, in July 1864, but the Navy-designed Casco class monitors, including Tunxis, proved so unseaworthy as to be virtually useless, and Tunxis was never to see action. The last two Navy vessels built by the company were two 420-ton tugs, Pinta and Nina, but neither were delivered until some months after the war's end.

== Postwar period ==
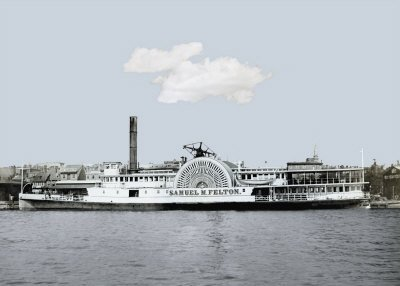
The paddle steamer Samuel M. Felton, one of the few notable vessels built by Reaney, Son & Archbold in the postwar period

Following the end of hostilities, the U.S. government, which had requisitioned hundreds of ships during the war, dumped more than a million tons of shipping onto the market, depressing prices and leaving U.S. shipyards with little or no work. Many U.S. shipyards were forced out of business during this period, and the rest struggled to survive.

Between 1865 and 1868, Reaney, Son & Archbold secured contracts for only two vessels of over 1,000 tons—the 1,430 ton passenger-cargo ship Thomas Kelso in 1865, and the 1,074 ton passenger-cargo vessel Tioga in 1867. In 1866 it also built the 671-ton sidewheel steamer Samuel M. Felton, which for some years was the fastest vessel on the Delaware River on the route between Philadelphia and Wilmington. Apart from these however, the yard could secure little more than a handful of contracts for tugboats and barges and for ship repairs.

To try to make up for the lack of activity on the waterfront, the company attempted to diversify. In late 1865, it built the engines for two locomotives, Nos. 263 and 264 for the Baltimore and Ohio Railroad Company, at a cost of $20,000 each, along with the tender wheels for twenty more. Later, it built sawmill engines, blast engines, boilers, and even a steam fire engine.

In 1868, the company finally secured a substantial contract, for the construction of five cargo ships for the Philadelphia & Reading Railroad Company, which were duly completed between 1869 and 1870. Briefly it appeared as if the company, with the patronage of the Railroad, might be able to overcome its difficulties, but then the Railroad decided to cancel its plans for more ships.

== Roach takeover ==
In February 1870, Reaney, Son & Archbold attempted a financial restructure by creating a new entity called the Reaney Engineering and Shipbuilding Works of Chester, with an authorized capital of $750,000 and shares with a par value of $100. The restructure failed and Reaney, Son & Archbold went into receivership in January 1871.

In June 1871, the New York-based industrialist John Roach bought the Reaney shipyard for $450,000. Roach initially tried to retain the services of Thomas Reaney's son William, by making him manager of the yard and selling him $40,000 worth of stock for $10,000. In the second year of Roach's ownership however, both William Reaney and assistant manager Henry Steers, who had accepted a similar deal, sold their stock and quit the company, fearing it was about to go broke.

Roach renamed the yard the Delaware River Iron Ship Building and Engine Works. He subsequently transformed it into America's largest and most modern shipbuilding facility, building more tonnage of ships in almost every year from 1871 to 1885 than America's next two biggest iron shipyards combined. Following Roach's retirement in 1885, the yard remained in the hands of the Roach family until 1908 when they retired from the business. The yard was reopened by Charles Jack and W. Averell Harriman for several years during and after World War I to manufacture ships for the U.S. Shipping Board, under the name of Merchant Shipbuilding Corporation.

== See also ==
- John Roach & Sons
- Delaware River Iron Ship Building and Engine Works
- Merchant Shipbuilding Corporation
- Malster & Reanie
