= Combination Steel and Iron Company =

Steel mill in Chester, Pennsylvania

- Company type: Private
- Industry: Manufacturing
- Predecessor: None
- Founded: 1880
- Founder: John Roach
- Headquarters: Chester, Pennsylvania, United States
- Products: Steel rails, bars and other steel parts
- Owner: John Roach (to 1885)
- Parent: John Roach & Sons

The Combination Steel and Iron Company was a steel mill founded in Chester, Pennsylvania by shipbuilder John Roach in 1880. Unlike Roach's other companies, Combination Iron and Steel was initially established not to support the operations of his Chester shipyard, but to produce steel rails and other products for third parties. Roach lost control of the company after his shipbuilding business entered receivership in 1885.

== History ==
After noting the rapidly growing demand for steel products in the United States, Roach decided to take advantage of it by establishing a second steel mill in addition to his existing mill, the Chester Rolling Mill, which was utilized mainly for supplying steel parts for his ships. Roach raised capital for his new company from a number of business associates including George E. Weed and his brother Charles, Samuel Chalfin, Jerome Keeley and Roach's eldest son John Baker Roach.

The Combination Steel and Iron Company was established in 1880 with Roach Sr. as president, George E. Weed secretary and treasurer, and Charles A. Weed as general manager. The new plant's main building was 280 x 80 ft in size with a 70-foot wing, and the plant, which eventually employed 175 workers, commenced production on January 17, 1881. One of the company's first orders was for 15,000 tons of steel rails for the Northern Pacific Railroad Company, but when Roach had trouble sourcing the steel from existing suppliers, he decided to establish his own steelmaking firm, the Standard Steel Casting Company, which commenced production in 1884.

The Combination Steel and Iron Company was soon producing 150 tons of steel a week. By the mid-1880s, the company plant included eight furnaces, plus a rail mill with a capacity of 30,000 tons per annum, a 20-inch angle mill with an annual capacity of 10,000 tons, and a 12-inch bar mill with an annual capacity of 6,000 tons.

In 1885, the Roach business empire was forced into receivership after the U.S. government voided one of its shipbuilding contracts. Roach was subsequently forced to sell most of his companies to pay off his creditors, including the Combination Steel and Iron Company.
