= Robert Coontz =

American naval officer (1864–1935)

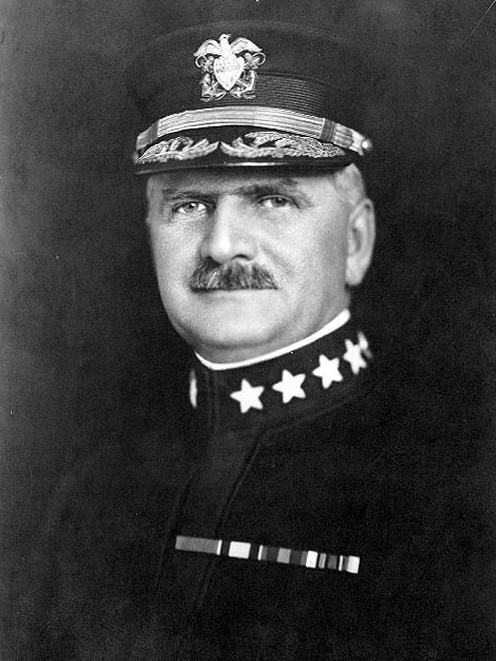
- Official portrait, c. 1919

16th Naval Governor of Guam
- In office January 30, 1912 – September 23, 1913
- Preceded by: George Salisbury
- Succeeded by: Alfred Walton Hinds

Chief of Naval Operations
- In office November 1, 1919 – July 21, 1923
- Preceded by: William S. Benson
- Succeeded by: Edward Walter Eberle

Personal details
- Born: June 11, 1864 Hannibal, Missouri, U.S.
- Died: January 26, 1935 (aged 70) Puget Sound Naval Hospital, Bremerton, Washington, U.S.
- Resting place: Mount Olivet Cemetery, Hannibal, Missouri, U.S.
- Spouse: Augusta Cohen

Military service
- Branch: United States Navy
- Years of service: 1881–1928
- Rank: Admiral
- Commands: Fifth Naval District; United States Fleet; Chief of Naval Operations; Puget Sound Navy Yard; USS Georgia; Governor of Guam
- Battles/wars: Spanish–American War; Philippine–American War; Battle of Veracruz; World War I
- Awards: Navy Distinguished Service Medal; Commander of the Legion of Honour (France)

Robert Edward Coontz (June 11, 1864 – January 26, 1935) was an American naval officer who sailed with the "Great White Fleet" and served as the second Chief of Naval Operations from 1919 to 1923.

== Early life and education ==
Robert Edward Coontz, son of Benton Coontz, was born in Hannibal, Missouri. His parents were originally from Florida, Missouri, where they had been neighbors and schoolmates of a young Sam Clemens. Robert's father was involved in several businesses, including owning Hannibal's streetcar system. While a young boy, Robert left his name for posterity by carving it into the rock of Mark Twain Cave, then known as McDowell's Cave.

After completing his primary education in Hannibal public schools, Coontz attended Ingleside College in Palmyra, Missouri, from 1878 to 1879, and Hannibal College (present day Hannibal-LaGrange University) from 1879 to 1880. Coontz asked family friend Congressman William H. Hatch for an appointment to the United States Naval Academy. Several other young men from the congressional district also desired the appointment, so a competitive exam was arranged, which Coontz won.

== Career ==
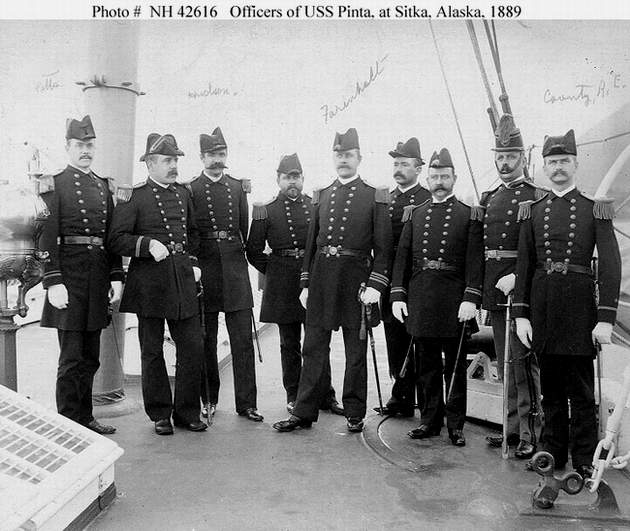
Ensign Robert Coontz (far right) and other ships officers aboard the USS Pinta, 1889.

Coontz graduated from the Naval Academy in 1885, and served at the Navy Department and in several ships over the next decade, among them vessels stationed in Alaskan waters and the Great Lakes. He returned to the Navy Department late in 1894, to work on updating officer records, then was assigned to the cruiser USS Philadelphia, the United States Coast and Geodetic Survey, and the cruiser USS Charleston.

During the Spanish–American War Charleston and he seized control of Guam, then joined Admiral George Dewey's forces in the Philippines. He would remain in the Pacific, seeing action in the Philippine–American War. Following further duty afloat and ashore, Coontz, then a lieutenant commander, was executive officer of the battleship USS Nebraska during the 1907–1909 world cruise of the "Great White Fleet". In 1899, Coontz became a Veteran Companion of the Pennsylvania Society of the Military Order of Foreign Wars.

After promotion to commander in 1909, Coontz was Commandant of Midshipmen at the Naval Academy. On January 30, 1912, Coontz became the Governor of Guam, until September 23, 1913. As Captain, Coontz served as Commanding Officer of the battleship USS Georgia, followed by duty as Commandant of the Puget Sound Navy Yard and the 13th Naval District. He held those positions until late in 1918. Following a brief period as acting Chief of Naval Operations, Rear Admiral Coontz assumed command of a battleship division in the Atlantic.

Coontz had just been assigned to the Pacific Fleet in September 1919, when he was selected to become Chief of Naval Operations (CNO), succeeding Admiral William S. Benson. Reportedly, his term as CNO was marked by unceasing pressure for economy, Congressional unhappiness over base closings, diplomatic efforts to achieve naval limitations, internal Navy Department conflicts over organization and the best ways to manage new technologies, plus the naval fallout of the Teapot Dome scandal. While dealing with these problems, Admiral Coontz established a unified United States Fleet and strengthened the CNO's position within the Navy Department. Relieved as CNO in August 1923, by Admiral Edward W. Eberle, Coontz was able to return to sea as Commander in Chief of the United States Fleet.

In June 1925, as Admiral, the Coontz led U.S. fleet, consisting of 57 vessels of United States Navy carrying about 25,000 officers and crew, departed the port of San Francisco, California. He led the fleet on a trans-Pacific visit to New Zealand and Australia, byway of Hawaii and Pago Page, American Samoa. This was the first massed deployment of American battleships since the "Great White Fleet" cruise, nearly two decades earlier, and a valuable demonstration of their strategic reach. The last U.S. fleet departed Australia on August 6, 1925. The fleet played a significant role in strengthening Australia-American relations during the interwar years in the lead up to the signing of the formal ANZAS Alliance in 1941.

Coontz is also acknowledged for his key role in the promotion of U.S. naval aviation. He lobbied for converting the USS Lexington and USS Saratoga from Lexington-class battlecruisers to Lexington-class aircraft carriers following the Washington Naval Treaty, ships that would prove vital for training in the inter-war years and as fighting ships during World War II. From October 1925, until his retirement in June 1928, he served as Commandant of the Fifth Naval District, reverting to the rank of rear admiral.

== Later life ==
After retiring, Coontz wrote a memoir chronicling his early life growing up in Hannibal, Missouri, and his navy career, titled From the Mississippi to the Sea.^{[2]} Coontz was briefly recalled to active duty in 1930, to investigate railroads in Alaska. A second book, True Anecdotes of an Admiral, was published in 1934. Two years later in 1932, Coontz would represent Alaska at the Democratic National Convention. It was also in 1932, that he became Commander-in-Chief of the Veterans of Foreign Wars. In 1934, Coontz suffered a series of heart attacks. On January 26, 1935, Coontz died at the Puget Sound Naval Hospital in Bremerton, Washington. He is buried in Mount Olivet Cemetery in Hannibal, Missouri.

== Personal life ==
On October 31, 1890, in Sitka, Alaska, Coontz married Augusta Cohen, daughter of Abraham Cohen. They had three children, Benton, Kenneth, and Bertha.

== Selected works ==
- Robert E. Coontz (1930) From the Mississippi to the Sea. Philadelphia: Dorrance & Co, Inc. See also "United States Naval History: A Bibliography". Archived from the original on February 6, 1997.

== Honors ==
- Coontz (DLG-9), a Farragut-class destroyer leader/frigate and Admiral R. E. Coontz (AP-122), an Admiral W. S. Benson-class transport were named in his honor.
- The Admiral Coontz Armory in Hannibal, Missouri is named in his honor.
- Coontz Junior High School in Bremerton, Washington. Destroyed by fire December 15, 1974.

== See also ==
- List of members of the American Legion

== Notes ==
Military offices
Preceded by William S. Benson	Chief of Naval Operations; 1919–1923	Succeeded by Edward W. Eberle
Preceded by Hilary P. Jones	Commander in Chief, United States Fleet; 1923–1925	Succeeded by Samuel S. Robison
