= John Roach & Sons =

19th-century American shipbuilding and manufacturing conglomerate

Coordinates: 39°50′17.47″N 75°33′5.33″W

- Type: Private
- Industry: Shipbuilding
- Founded: 1 Jan 1864
- Founder: John Roach
- Defunct: 1885
- Headquarters: Chester, Pennsylvania, United States
- Products: Iron and steel ships, marine steam engines, iron and steel products
- Services: Ship repairs
- Owner: Roach family
- Number of employees: 4,000+
- Subsidiaries: Etna Iron Works; Morgan Iron Works; Delaware River Iron Ship Building & Engine Works; Chester Rolling Mill; Hirsch Propeller Company; Chalmers-Spence Company; Chester Pipe and Tube Company; Combination Steel and Iron Company; Standard Steel Casting Company; United States and Brazil Mail Steamship Company

John Roach & Sons was a major 19th-century American shipbuilding and manufacturing firm founded in 1864 by Irish-American immigrant John Roach. Between 1871 and 1885, the company was the largest shipbuilding firm in the United States, building more iron ships than its next two major competitors combined. It was also by far the largest contractor to the U.S. Navy during this period, and at its peak is said to have been the nation's largest employer behind the railroads.

== Overview ==
The company, originally named John Roach & Son, was established in 1864 as the operating and marketing firm for Roach's Etna Iron Works in New York, and gave Roach's eldest son, William Henry Roach, a stake in the business. Roach's other sons later joined the partnership.

As Roach's business empire expanded, a number of new companies were added as subsidiaries, the most important of which were the Delaware River Iron Ship Building and Engine Works in Chester, Pennsylvania, which was the main shipbuilding facility, and the Morgan Iron Works in New York. A network of other companies supported these two manufacturing plants, making John Roach & Sons one of the first companies in the United States to adopt the vertical integration model.

== Subsidiaries ==
Subsidiaries of John Roach & Sons included:

- Etna Iron Works (New York)—established by Roach in 1852. This company built ship engines and was discontinued after Roach's acquisition of the Morgan Iron Works;
- Morgan Iron Works (New York)—Roach's second company, which he acquired from shipping magnate Charles Morgan in 1867. Like the Etna Works, this company was mainly a manufacturer of ship engines, although it also did ship repairs. After Roach's acquisition of the Delaware River Works, the Morgan Works also did plumbing and finishing for the ships built there;
- Delaware River Iron Ship Building and Engine Works (Chester, Pennsylvania)—Roach's main facility, acquired from Reaney, Son & Archbold in 1871. It was the largest shipyard in the country during Roach Sr.'s management;
- Chester Rolling Mill (Chester, PA)—an iron (later steel) rolling mill for supplying the Delaware River Works with iron and steel frames and plates for the ships built there, which began production in 1875.

Other companies owned and controlled by the Roach family which may or may not have been formally incorporated as subsidiaries of John Roach & Sons include:

- Hirsch Propeller Company—founded by Roach to manufacture the patented Hirsch propeller. Roach acquired an exclusive patent to sell these propellers in several U.S. states, and also fitted them to his own ships;
- Chalmers-Spence Company—founded by Roach to manufacture patented asbestos insulation for the steam pipes in his ships;
- Chester Pipe and Tube Company (Chester, PA)—established by Roach and several prominent local Chester business identities to manufacture iron pipes and tubing for Roach's ships and other companies;
- Combination Steel and Iron Company (Chester, PA)—established by Roach in 1880 for the manufacture of steel rails and other steel products. This company was also used by Roach to manufacture steel parts for his ships;
- Standard Steel Casting Company (Thurlow, PA)—established by Roach in 1883 to manufacture steel ingots for his other steel companies.
- United States and Brazil Mail Steamship Company—a shipping line founded by Roach in 1876..

== History ==
At its peak, John Roach & Sons is said to have had a larger payroll than any other company in the United States with the exception of the railroads, employing in excess of a total of 3,000 men at the Delaware River Shipbuilding Works and Morgan Iron Works alone.

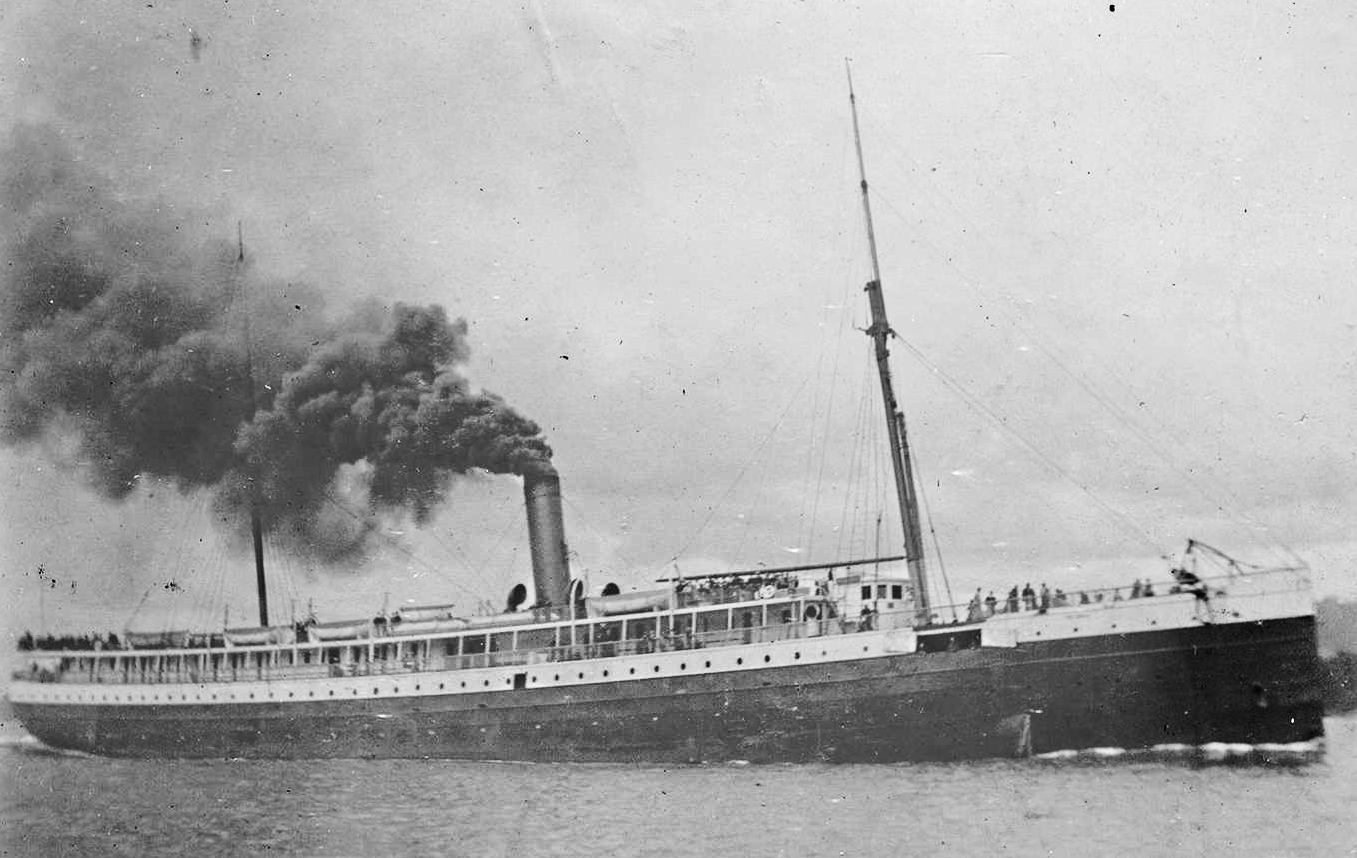
The innovative Columbia, constructed by John Roach & Sons in 1880, was the first ship to use incandescent light bulbs.

John Roach & Sons remained the nation's largest shipbuilder from the establishment of the Delaware River Iron Shipbuilding and Engine Works in 1871 until 1885, building more tonnage of iron ships in these years than its next two major competitors combined. In 1880, the innovative coastal passenger steamship Columbia was constructed at John Roach & Sons. Destined for the Oregon Railroad and Navigation Company, Columbia was the first ship to utilize a dynamo and was the first structure other than Thomas Edison's Menlo Park, New Jersey laboratory to use incandescent light bulbs. The company was forced into receivership in 1885 after the voiding of several U.S. Navy contracts by a hostile Cleveland administration, which suspected Roach of corruptly receiving government contracts under previous Republican administrations. The ships involved were the US Navy's first four steel-hulled warships, Atlanta, Boston, Chicago, and Dolphin. The award of all four ships to the same builder was a factor in the corruption charges. Roach Sr. died in 1887, while the company was still in receivership.

After the windup of John Roach & Sons and sale of assets to pay creditors, Roach's heirs found themselves still in possession of the Delaware River Works and the Morgan Iron Works, and they continued to build ships at the Delaware Works under the management of Roach's eldest surviving son John Baker Roach until the latter's death in 1908. In all, John Roach and his heirs built a total of 179 ships between 1871 and 1908. After the retirement of the Roach family from the business, railroad heir W. Averell Harriman acquired the Chester shipyard, renamed it the Merchant Shipbuilding Corporation, and used it to build merchant ships during World War I.
