= Chester Pipe and Tube Company =

American manufacturing company

- Type: Private
- Industry: Manufacturing
- Predecessor: None
- Founded: 1877
- Founder: John Roach
- Defunct: 1899
- Fate: Merged
- Successor: National Tube Company
- Headquarters: Chester, Pennsylvania, United States
- Products: Boiler and other pipes, iron and steel tubing
- Total assets: $300,000 (1880s)
- Number of employees: 200 (1880s)

The Chester Pipe and Tube Company was a company incorporated in 1877 in Chester, Pennsylvania, by shipbuilder John Roach for the manufacture of iron pipes and boiler tubes for the steamships built at his Chester shipyard, the Delaware River Iron Ship Building and Engine Works.

Incorporated for a sum of $300,000, the Chester Pipe and Tube Company was located on 17 acres (69,000 m^{2}) of land at the intersection of Front and West Streets in Chester, adjacent to another Roach company, the Chester Rolling Mill, and close to Roach's shipyard. Two large brick buildings and a number of smaller ones were erected onsite, and a workforce of approximately 200 was employed there. By the early 1880s, the company was manufacturing about 18,000 tons of wrought iron pipes annually from 20,000 tons of skelp iron.

In 1880, Potts Brothers Iron Company Ltd., which owned a rolling mill in Pottstown, Pennsylvania, acquired a controlling interest in the Chester Pipe and Tube Company. Colonel Joseph D. Potts, a prominent figure in the transportation business, purchased the Potts Brothers Iron Company in 1890, and thereafter became President of the Chester Pipe and Tube Company, a position he retained until his death in 1893.

In June 1899, the Chester Pipe and Tube Company was consolidated with twenty other pipemaking firms in the northeastern United States to form the National Tube Company. In 1901, the National Tube Company and nine other major American steel companies merged to form the world's first billion dollar company, U.S. Steel.

The National Tube Company was a subsidiary of U.S. Steel until 31 December 1951 and together with a number of other wholly owned subsidiaries in an internal corporate restructuring became a division of the United States Steel Company (a subsidiary of the U.S. Steel Corporation).
