= USS Pinta =

Tugboat of the United States Navy

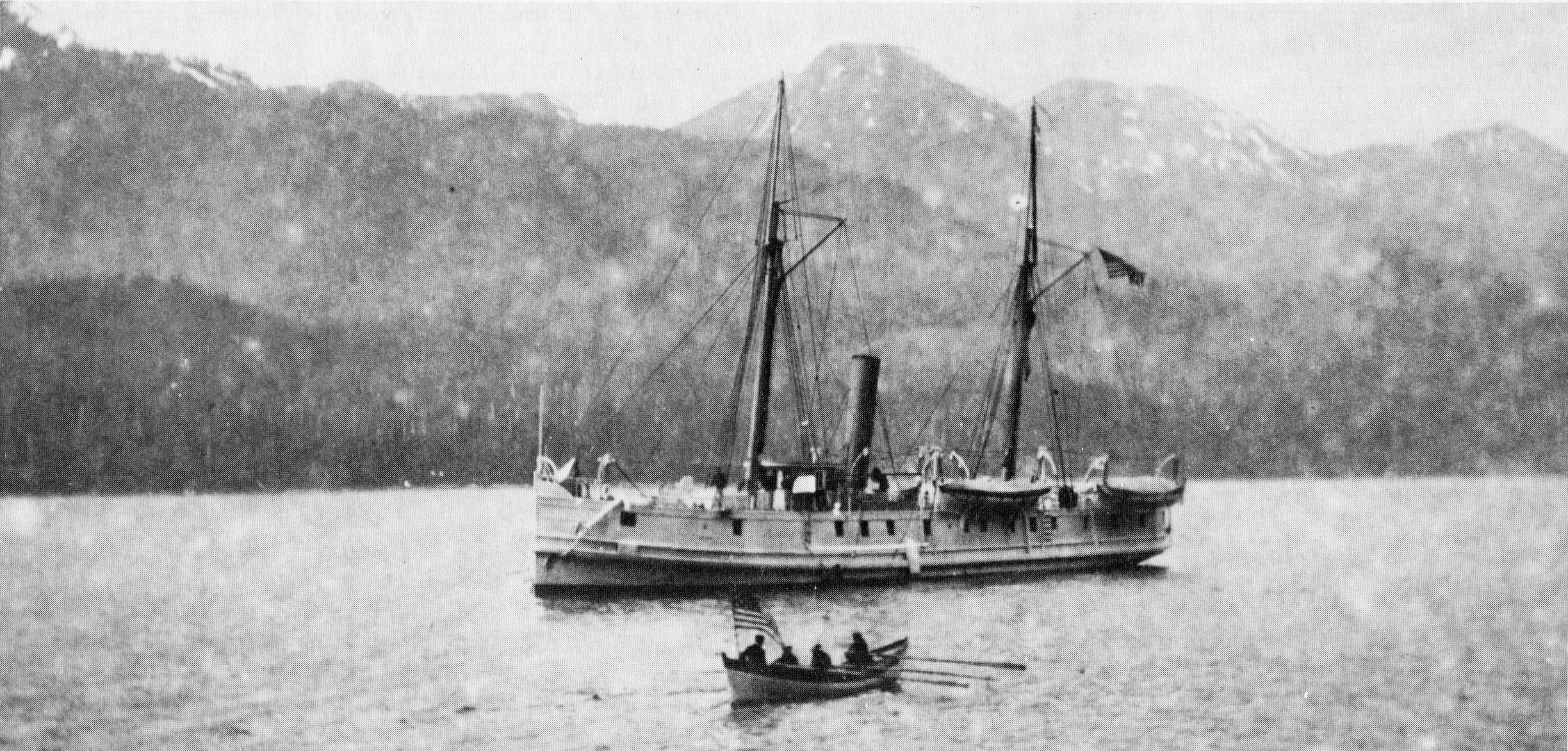
- USS Pinta in Juneau Harbor, Alaska, in 1889

History

United States
- Name: USS Pinta
- Namesake: Pinta
- Builder: Reaney, Son & Archbold, Chester, Pennsylvania
- Launched: 29 October 1864
- Completed: October 1865
- Decommissioned: 4 August 1897
- Stricken: 2 January 1908

General characteristics
- Type: Screw tug
- Displacement: 306 long tons (311 t)
- Length: 137 ft (42 m)
- Beam: 26 ft (7.9 m)
- Draft: 11 ft (3.4 m)
- Speed: 8.5 knots (15.7 km/h; 9.8 mph)
- Complement: 52
- Armament: 2 × 30-pounder Parrott rifles; 1 × 12-pounder howitzer

USS Pinta was an iron-hulled screw tug of the United States Navy, launched on October 29, 1864, by Reaney, Son & Archbold, Chester, Pennsylvania, completed in October 1865, and commissioned there.

== Service history ==
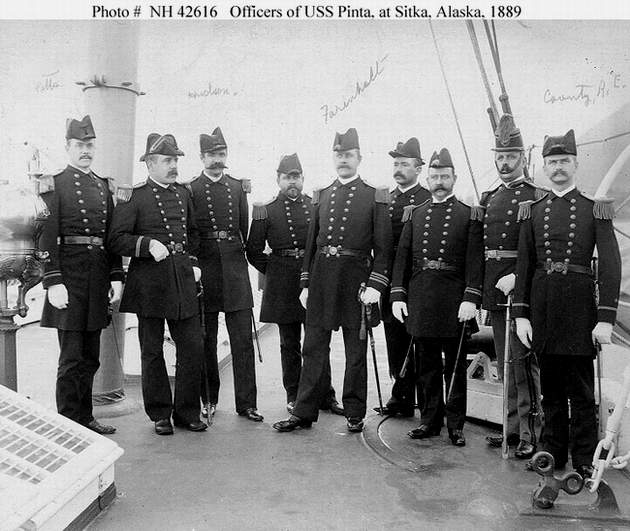
Ships officers off Sitka, Alaska in 1889. Among those pictured is Ensign Robert E. Coontz (far right), who would later rise to Chief of Naval Operations.

=== 1866–1876 ===
Except for a period in ordinary during 1867, Pinta served on harbor duty at the Philadelphia Navy Yard from 1866 until laid up in 1872. She recommissioned at Philadelphia on November 22, 1873, and operated out of Key West on various duties including messenger service, naval drill in Florida Bay and towing and freight services. She decommissioned at Norfolk Navy Yard on April 15, 1876, and was laid up there until reactivated as a yard tug in 1878.

=== 1878–1897 ===
Overhauled at the Norfolk Navy Yard from 1881 until February 24, 1883, in preparation for duty off Alaska, Pinta arrived Sitka, Alaska, and relieved Adams on August 17, 1884. She patrolled Alaskan waters protecting the seal fisheries until April 10, 1889, when she sailed for the Mare Island Navy Yard for repairs. She returned to her home port, Sitka, on October 17, 1889, and continued to engage in patrol operations in the Bering Sea. Among the Alaskan ports she frequently visited were: Fort Wrangel, Fort Rupert, Port Simpson, Port Protection, Port Chester, William Henry, Juneau, Killisnoo, Ketchikan, Shakan, Loring, Hoonah, and Killimo.

Pinta returned to Mare Island Navy Yard on July 17, 1897, and decommissioned there on August 4, 1897. In 1898 she underwent repairs. She served with the Naval Militia at San Diego, California from 1898 to January 2, 1908, when she was struck from the Naval Vessel Register.

== See also ==
- Robert Coontz
