= Skelp =

Skelp (sometimes spelled scelp) is wrought iron or steel that is rolled or forged into narrow strips and ready to be made into pipe or tubing by being bent (into a cylindrical shape) and welded. The word is most commonly used in the traditional terminology of smithing and in the iron and steel industries. Before the 20th century, the welding was likely to be forge welding. In the 20th and 21st centuries, it has been likelier to be arc welding or gas welding.

In the context of traditional gunsmithing, one way to make gun barrels has been to make them from skelp, like one would make other pipe or tubing. Barrels made from skelp have typically been thought of as having inferior quality. (Pipe made from skelp can be perfectly acceptable in quality, but a gun barrel must withstand much higher pressures than most pipes.) Cheap gun barrels could be made this way in the Damascus method—wrapping the skelp around a mandrel to make spirals which were then hammered and forged into a tube. The mandrel was then removed, the interior reamed, and the exterior filed until a finished tube was complete. The tube was then polished and breeched.

This method of fabrication was used because it was difficult to cast a solid barrel and then drill it out without the bit coming out the side. In many regions and eras, especially before the 20th century, gunsmithing has been achieved without the help of advanced machine tool practice, such as gun drilling or advanced boring methods. In such contexts, advanced smithing and filing skills have often made up for the lack of machine tools.

Damascus barrels were generally designed for black powder charges. The breech end of the tube was much thicker than the muzzle end, and this held the initial impulse pressure from the black powder. By the time the bullet reached the muzzle, the pressure had dropped quite a bit, so muzzle reinforcement was not needed. This gave a better weight distribution through the length of the weapon.

Smokeless powders burn more slowly than black powder, thus maintaining high pressures throughout the barrel. Since the barrel is not reinforced at the muzzle, it may not be able to contain the pressure. Also, most Damascus barrels were made before modern smokeless powders, so the age of the barrel can be a safety hazard.

== Bibliography ==
- Russell, Carl P. (1957). Guns on the early frontiers: a history of firearms from colonial times through the years of the Western fur trade. Berkeley, CA, USA: University of California Press. LCCN 57-6042.
