= Delaware River Iron Ship Building and Engine Works =

Shipyard in Pennsylvania, United States

Coordinates: 39°50′16.67″N 75°22′5.35″W

- Type: Private
- Industry: Shipbuilding
- Predecessor: Reaney, Son & Archbold
- Founded: 1871
- Founder: John Roach
- Defunct: 1908
- Successor: Chester Shipbuilding Co., Merchant Shipbuilding Corporation
- Headquarters: Chester, Pennsylvania, United States
- Products: Iron and steel ships, marine steam engines
- Services: Ship repairs
- Owner: Roach family
- Number of employees: 500–1,800
- Parent: John Roach & Sons

The Delaware River Iron Ship Building and Engine Works (founded in 1871) (Note: There are many variants of the company name according to different sources, the most common variant being "Shipbuilding" as a single word instead of two. Other variations are "Delaware River International Shipbuilding and Engine Works", "Delaware River Iron Shipbuilding and Engineering Works", "Delaware River Shipbuilding Company", "Delaware River Steamboat Company", etc. Some of these names may have been official variations of the original company name, or they may simply be transcription errors.) was a major late-19th-century American shipyard located on the Delaware River in Chester, Pennsylvania. It was founded by the industrialist John Roach and is often referred to by its parent company name of John Roach & Sons, or just known as the Roach shipyard. For the first fifteen years of its existence, the shipyard was by far the largest and most productive in the United States, building more tonnage of ships than its next two major competitors combined, in addition to being the U.S. Navy's largest contractor. The yard specialized in the production of large passenger freighters, but built every kind of vessel from warships to cargo ships, oil tankers, ferries, barges, tugs and yachts.

Following a protracted dispute over a U.S. Navy contract for the USS Dolphin in the early 1880s, the company's founder John Roach placed John Roach & Sons into receivership in 1885. After settlement of the parent company's debts, the Delaware River Iron Ship Building and Engine Works was reopened by Roach's sons and continued in operation until shortly after the death of Roach's eldest son John Baker Roach in 1908, at which point the Roach family retired from the shipbuilding business.

Over the course of its 37-year history, the Roach shipyard had many notable achievements to its credit. In 1874 it built City of Peking and City of Tokio, the two largest gross-tonnage ships ever built in the United States to that date and the second largest in the world after the experimental British behemoth Great Eastern. In 1883 it constructed America's first steamer with a steel-plated hull, Alaskan. The yard played a key role in the so-called "Birth of the New Navy" when it built the four "ABCD ships"—the U.S. Navy's first steel ships. It also established a reputation for itself as a builder of lavishly outfitted "night boats" for the Long Island Sound trade, and in its last years, built the first three American ships to be powered by steam turbines. In total, the Delaware River Works built 179 ships between 1871 and 1908, including 10 warships for the U.S. Navy.

Following the retirement of the Roach family in 1908, the shipyard remained idle for some years until being reopened as the Chester Shipbuilding Co. by a naval officer, C. P. M. Jack, in 1913. It was subsequently purchased in 1917 by W. Averell Harriman for building merchant ships during World War I, when it was renamed the Merchant Shipbuilding Corporation. The yard closed permanently in 1923, and the location repurposed as the Ford Motor Company Chester Assembly factory until 1961.

== Background ==
John Roach began his career in the United States in 1832 as a semi-literate Irish immigrant laborer, eventually establishing his own small business with the purchase of the Etna Iron Works. Roach took advantage of the American Civil War to transform the Etna Iron Works into a major manufacturer of marine steam engines, and after the war, with the purchase in 1867 of the Morgan Iron Works, secured a near-monopoly on marine engine building in New York City.

Roach had observed that the British were in the process of replacing their merchant fleet of dated wooden-hulled paddle steamers with modern iron-hulled, screw-propelled vessels, and he anticipated a similar trend in the United States. Since the iron shipbuilding capacity of the U.S. was still modest, he saw an opportunity to fill the anticipated demand with the establishment of an iron shipyard of his own.

Roach carefully selected Chester, Pennsylvania as the site for his new shipyard. The locality had a number of advantages, including cheap and plentiful land along the banks of the Delaware River, proximity to Pennsylvania's iron and coal mining industries, an established river and rail transport network, and a readily available labor force.

Accordingly, he purchased a substantial property in early 1871 on the banks of the Delaware, but around the same time, the shipyard of Reaney, Son & Archbold in the same locality entered receivership, and Roach decided to purchase that shipyard instead of starting his own from scratch. In June 1871, he bought the former Reaney shipyard from the receivers for the sum of $450,000, and renamed it the Delaware River Iron Ship Building and Engine Works.

== Development ==
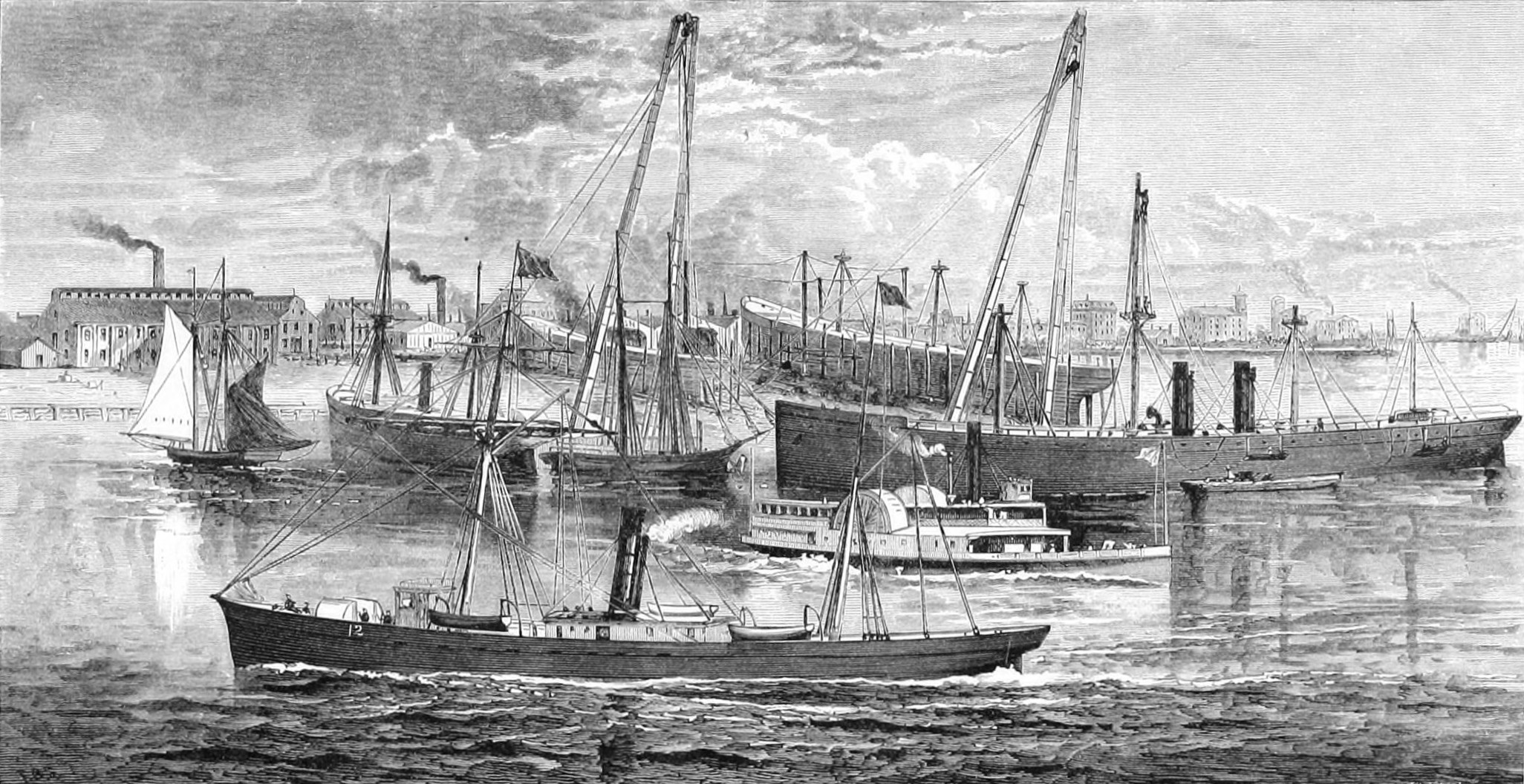
Chester waterfront, ca. 1875

With the purchase of the Reaney property, Roach found himself in possession of a first-class shipyard. The spacious 23-acre (93,000 m^{2}) yard was ideally situated along a 1,200-foot (370 m) stretch of the Delaware where the river was over a mile wide and 18 feet (5.5 m) deep at the shore, allowing for launching of the largest vessels. The riverfront property was extensive enough to allow the construction of up to ten building slipways, as well as three piers capable of docking an additional six ships. The Reaney firm itself had already ploughed more than a million dollars into plant and equipment since opening the yard in 1859.

Roach was not content with the existing plant however. Like his early mentor James P. Allaire, Roach envisaged a vertically integrated shipbuilding empire stretching from control of the raw materials to the finished ships. Accordingly, he established his own iron mill, the Chester Rolling Mill, for the production of iron plates, beams and other parts for his ships. The Mill, located on a 30-acre (120,000 m^{2}) lot upriver from the shipyard, began production in July 1875, and had an annual output of 700 tons of pig iron and 300 tons of ship plate.

Roach also founded a number of other firms to meet the material needs of his shipyard. He established the nearby Chester Pipe and Tube Company, from which he could source the large amount of iron piping and quality boiler tubes required for his ships. With the purchase of a patent for an asbestos compound, he founded the Chalmers-Spence Company to provide pipe insulation. He also secured exclusive patent rights in Pennsylvania, New York, New Jersey and Delaware for the Hirsch propeller, a European design which lessened vibration, and he founded the Hirsch Propeller Company to manufacture it. The result of these efforts was a network of companies that made the Roach shipyard largely independent of third-party suppliers, enabling Roach to minimize costs and undercut his competitors.

Roach was also a keen proponent of labor-saving devices and continually looked for ways to cut down on costs by the use of machinery. He installed steam cranes, power punches, and a small railroad network to move materials within his plant—enough power equipment in total to require a dozen steam engines with a collective output of 700 horsepower (520 kW). By such means he ensured that his shipyard remained one of the most modern and efficient in the country.

== Management structure ==
Roach helped secure his business position in Chester by going into partnership with two prominent Chester families, the Houstons and Crozers. He made Charles B. Houston general manager of the Chester Rolling Mill and Charles' brother David paymaster, while a third brother, Thomas, was also given a management position. The Houstons had investments in Pennsylvania's iron and coal mines, and they also controlled Chester's only newspaper, the Chester Times. The Houstons in turn shared business interests with Samuel A. Crozer, son of John Price Crozer, whose extended family—the wealthiest in Chester—owned the city's largest textile mills. Collectively, the Roach, Houston and Crozer families employed 25% of Chester's working population and accounted for 35% of its payroll, their partnership virtually ensuring dominance of the city's politics.

After taking over the Reaney yard, Roach initially attempted to retain its former managers William B. Reaney and Henry Steers by selling each of them $40,000 worth of shares in the company for $10,000 apiece, with the difference to be made up over time by payment of dividends. Roach hoped that by giving the men a stake in the business he would cement their loyalty, but in the yard's second year of operations, both resold their shares to Roach and resigned, fearing the yard was about to become bankrupt.

After their departure, Roach elevated his eldest son, John Baker Roach, to management of the yard. Because John B.'s management experience was mostly in farming rather than shipbuilding however, Roach senior made a point of traveling from New York to Chester every Saturday, where he would conduct a thorough tour of every department, checking the workmanship, and ordering modifications and adjustments where required. This management arrangement persisted for almost the whole of John Roach senior's presidency of the company.

== Labor relations ==
Like most industrialists of his era, Roach was staunchly anti-union, and insisted his employees negotiate on an individual basis for their wages. Roach however, took the concept of individual negotiation much further than most of his contemporaries. Instead of paying a set wage to workers based on their qualifications or skill, he organized a sliding scale of wages for each group, based on a set of criteria Roach himself deemed important. A worker who met all the criteria would receive the top rate, while those who did not would have their wages progressively reduced, depending on the number of criteria they failed. Criteria for payment included not only a worker's skill level, but his punctuality, dependability, eagerness and quality of work, in addition to which his moral character was subject to assessment. Workers who spent too much on alcohol, who paid their rent erratically, whose families were poorly clothed, or whose children did not attend church or school, could expect to have their wages reduced still further.

There could thus be spectacular differences in pay within a particular group, with the most valued workers sometimes receiving as much as fives times more than the least valued. Even Roach's best paid workers, however, were usually paid little better, and sometimes worse, than comparable tradesmen at other yards, and Roach's overall wage rates were on average lower than his competitors. His business though did not suffer more industrial action, which Roach, who had spent many years as a tradesman himself, attributed to his rapport with his employees. A more concrete reason may have been the fact that Roach still operated his old New York shipyard, the Morgan Iron Works, so that when there was a strike at one plant he could readily defeat it by simply transferring his operations to the other.

Roach was also not above reducing the overall wages of his workforce in lean times, by as much as 15%, but when doing so would also reduce the rents by a corresponding degree for those workers living in housing provided by him. Roach was never able to supply housing for his entire workforce, but he did own about 100 houses in Chester, which were mostly rented by his foremen and other key personnel.

== John Roach Presidency, 1871–1887 ==
The first ship built by the Delaware Works was a 1,605-ton cargo ship, City of San Antonio—fittingly built for C. H. Mallory and Co., whose proprietor Charles Mallory would eventually become a business partner of Roach and one of his major customers.

=== Pacific Mail contracts ===
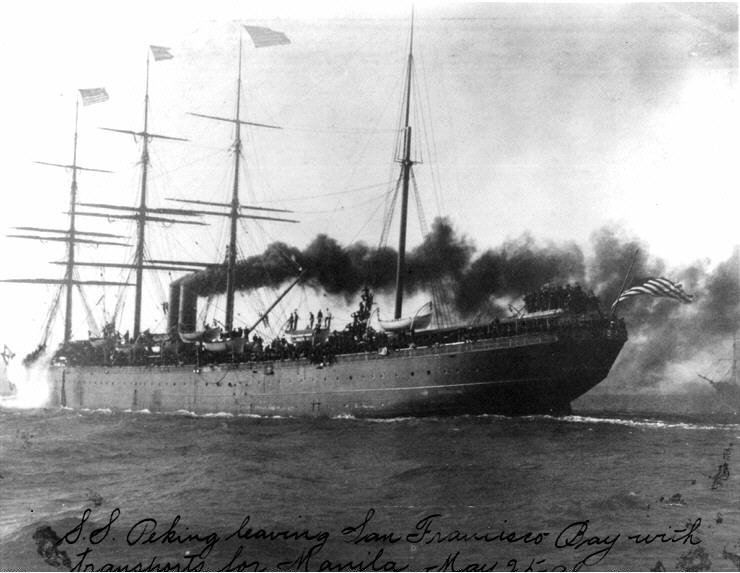
City of Peking. For many years she was the largest-tonnage U.S. ship afloat. She is seen here leaving San Francisco Bay with troops bound for the Philippines during the Spanish–American War of 1898.

In 1872, the U.S. Congress awarded the Pacific Mail Steamship Company a $500,000 annual subsidy to operate a steam packet service between the United States and the Far East. Pacific Mail thereupon decided to upgrade its entire fleet of aging, wood-hulled sidewheel steamers by replacing them with modern iron-hulled screw steamships. The Roach yard received a major boost when it won contracts to build nine of these new vessels for the company.

The first two of these ships, the passenger-cargo vessels Colon (2,686 tons) and Colima (2,906 tons), were delivered in November 1872 and April 1873 respectively, but in the spring of 1873, Pacific Mail informed Roach that it was unable to meet its obligations. Pacific Mail's president and another company director had depleted the company's cash reserves with a stock manipulation scheme, and then absconded with a large sum of money after the scheme fell through. To make matters worse, stock speculator Jay Gould, in an attempt to gain control of the company by driving down its share price, subsequently persuaded the U.S. Congress to rescind Pacific Mail's $500,000 subsidy. Roach was put in a difficult position since he had several Pacific Mail steamships still on the slipways, but he managed to delay his own creditors and renegotiate the Pacific Mail contract, reducing the latter's monthly obligations from $75,000 to $35,000.

In 1874, the Roach shipyard launched the Pacific Mail passenger-cargo steamers City of Peking and City of Tokio. At 5,033 gross tons each, these were by far the largest iron merchant steamships built to that date in the United States and almost twice the gross tonnage of the previous largest, the Cramp-built Pennsylvania class. In fact they were the largest gross-tonnage steamships in the world behind the experimental British ship Great Eastern (which was a commercial failure) and they remained the largest American-built steamships for a number of years. Between 1873 and 1875, Roach also completed the contracts for the remaining five Pacific Mail ships, City of Panama, City of Guatemala, City of San Francisco, City of New York and City of Sydney. He eventually built more ships for Pacific Mail, however, this early negative experience led him to reject future shipbuilding contracts sought on terms.

=== Other early customers ===
Roach had founded the Delaware shipyard in anticipation of a boom in iron shipbuilding in the United States. He was soon to discover that he had seriously underestimated the conservatism of American shipping lines, most of whom were content to continue ordering the familiar wooden-hulled paddle steamers in spite of the proven advantages of iron hulls and screw propulsion. In order to attract more business, Roach tried reducing the entry cost of purchase by offering to buy shares in the ships he sold, taking a corresponding ratio of their future earnings as part payment for their construction. In this way he found himself gradually accumulating substantial interests in a number of different shipping lines.

Three shipping lines whose owners understood the advantages of iron ships and who became repeat customers of the Roach shipyard in its early years were the Ocean Steamship Company, the Ward Line and the Mallory Line. For Ocean Steamship, which ran a line between San Francisco and Portland, Oregon, Roach built four passenger freighters of about 2,000 tons between 1877 and 1878: City of Macon, City of Savannah, City of Columbus and Gate City. Roach completed another three ships for the company between August and November 1882—the 2,670-ton passenger freighters Tallahassee, Chattahoochee and Nacoochie.

The Ward Line, which operated a line between the United States and Cuba, also supplied a steady trickle of contracts. The Roach yard completed the 2,265-ton sister ships Niagara and Saratoga for the Ward Line in 1877. The following year, the yard completed the 2,426-ton Sarataga II for the same company, and in 1879 completed the 2,300-ton Santiago. Another passenger-freighter, the 2,300-ton Cienfuegos, was completed for the Ward Line in 1883. Roach owned shares in some of these vessels, and he eventually became a director on the company's board.

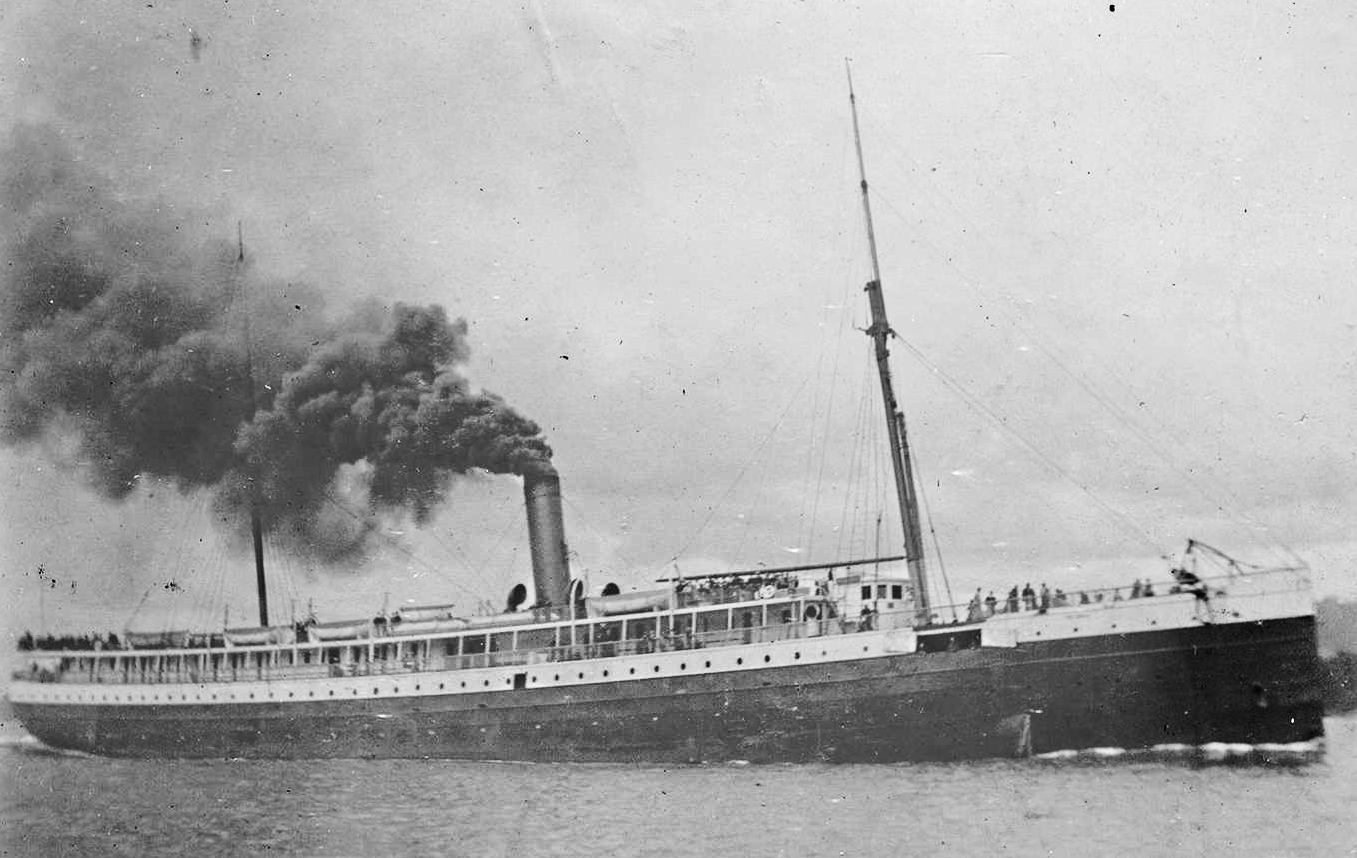
The coastal passenger steamer Columbia, constructed in 1880, was the first vessel to utilize a dynamo and the first structure other than Thomas Edison's Menlo Park, New Jersey laboratory to use incandescent light bulbs

Roach's best commercial customer in these early years was Charles Mallory, owner of the Mallory Line, which operated steamships between New York and various ports in the Gulf of Mexico. The Roach shipyard built a dozen ships for Mallory between 1872 and Roach's retirement in 1887. They included ten passenger freighters, ranging from the 1,486-ton City of Waco, built in 1873, to the 3,367-ton Nueces, completed in 1887, the others being State of Texas (completed 1874), Rio Grande (1876), Colorado (1879), Guadalupe and San Marcos (1881), Lampasus and Alamo (1883), and Comal (1885). Roach owned shares in almost all these ships.

In 1877, the Roach yard built a sectional dry dock for the Pensacola Navy Yard. Roach won the contract with a $219,000 bid, $60,000 lower than the next lowest bid, and completed the dock the same year. In 1880, Roach finished construction of the coastal passenger steamer Columbia for the Oregon Railroad and Navigation Company. Columbia was the first ship to utilize a dynamo and the first structure other than Thomas Edison's Menlo Park, New Jersey laboratory to use the incandescent light bulb. Due to the complexity of Edison's new lighting systems, the final installations of the Edison equipment on board Columbia were completed by Edison's personnel in New York City.

In 1881, Roach partnered with a business rival, William Cramp & Sons, to form the Iron Steamboat Company, which built a number of iron ferries of around 900 tons gross each to replace the wooden ferries still operating in New York Harbor. The Cramp yard built four of these ferries and the Roach yard built three—Signus, Cepheus, and Sirius. A notable vessel built by the yard in this period was the "night boat" Pilgrim for the Fall River Line, which was fitted with the largest simple walking beam engine ever installed in a steamboat.

=== Brazil Line ===
Contemporary illustration of City of Para. Launched with great fanfare in 1878 before President Rutherford B. Hayes and members of the U.S. Congress, the ship proved too large for her intended purpose and was soon sold.

Roach also built ships for a shipping line of his own. In 1879, with Mallory as a minor partner, he established the United States and Brazil Mail Steamship Company to operate a line between the U.S. and Brazil, through which he expected to foster America's export trade by the use of fast and reliable modern steamships. Roach hoped that the Brazil Line would be the first step in the creation of a vast global transportation network with John Roach & Sons at the center. Accordingly, he constructed two new 3,000-ton ships for the line, City of Rio de Janeiro and City of Para.

Roach invited President Rutherford B. Hayes and the entire U.S. Congress to the launch of City of Para in 1878, but to his consternation, his attempts to secure subsidies from the U.S. and Brazilian governments were both to meet with failure. Meanwhile, Mallory's misgivings that the ships were too big for the available trade proved correct, and Roach was faced with cutthroat competition from a British shipping line. After several years of increasing losses, he was forced in 1881 to sell the ships and wind up the Line.

Roach was not quite ready to concede defeat however. The following year, he organized a new Brazil Line with another investor, and built three new passenger freighters for it - Advance and Finance, both of 2,600 tons, and the 2,985-ton Allianca. The new Brazil Line would struggle on for a number of years without ever making a profit, before finally failing in 1893.

Roach lost almost a million dollars on the first Brazil Line alone, and the failed venture was to leave his shipyard chronically short of operating capital. The shortage of cash would eventually become a critical problem for the yard.

=== U.S. Navy contracts to 1876 ===
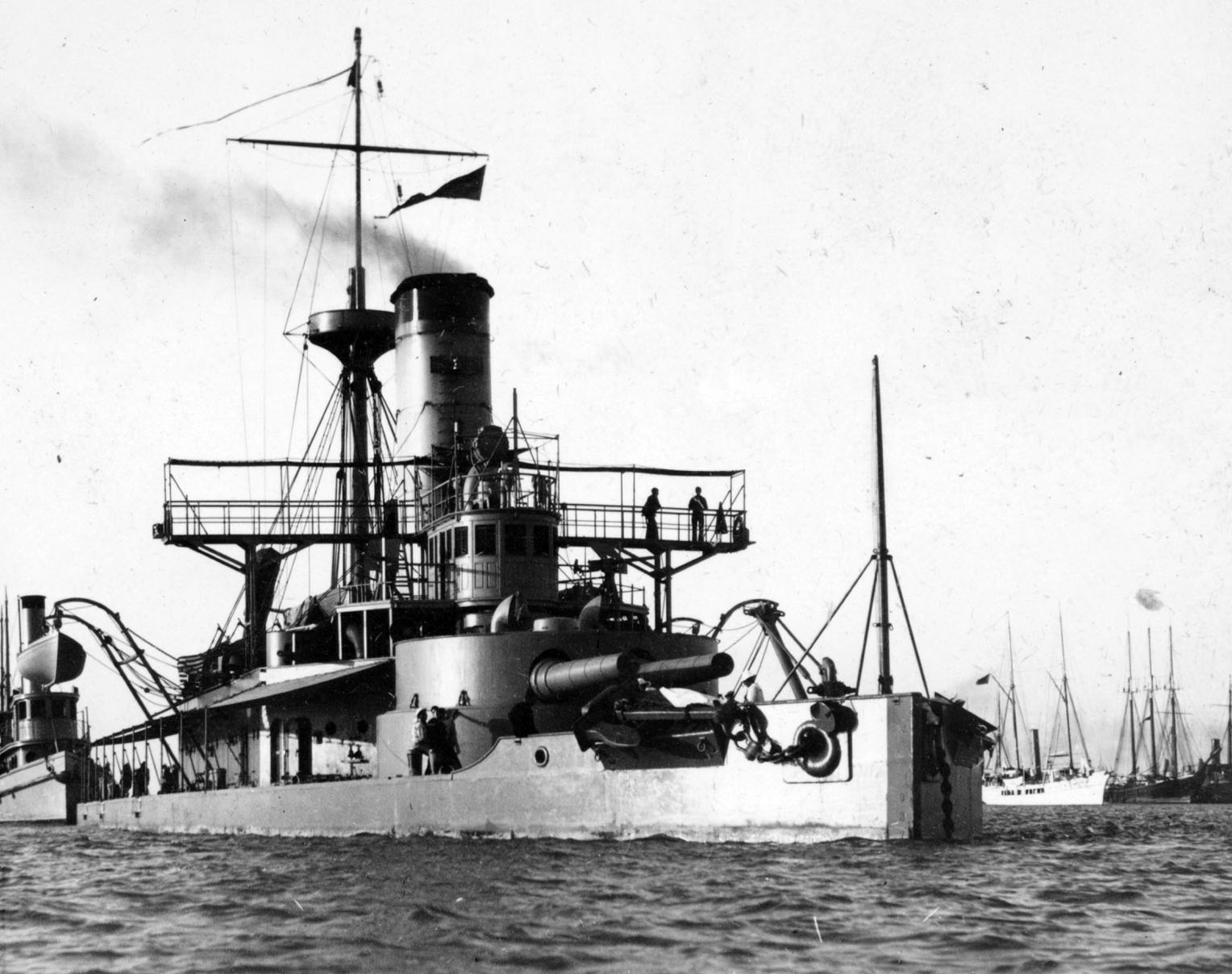
USS Puritan (BM-1) in 1898. Roach was left with a $200,000 unpaid bill and was forced to keep the warship in his shipyard for five years at his own expense before the government agreed to pay for the ship's completion.

For the first dozen years of its operations, the Roach shipyard was by far the U.S. Navy's biggest contractor. Between 1873 and 1885, the yard received almost $4 million in contracts from just one Navy department, four times as much as the next largest contractor. Unfortunately, Naval contracts in this era often turned out to be liabilities for shipyards, and this would also prove to be the case for John Roach & Sons.

The Delaware River Works completed its first job for the Navy—an engine for USS Mistletoe—in 1873. In 1874, a war scare over the Virginius incident with Spain prompted the Navy to hastily initiate a rebuilding program. As part of this program, the Roach yard secured contracts for the repair of four Civil War monitors: USS Wyandotte, USS Nahant, USS Jason and USS Passaic. The same year, the yard launched two Alert-class gunboats for the Navy, USS Alert and USS Huron, and supplied the engine for the third, USS Ranger. Apart from the fourteen ageing Civil War monitors still in service, the three Alert-class gunboats were the Navy's only iron-hulled vessels at this time.

The Virginius affair also prodded the Navy into construction of a new and more modern class of monitors, the Amphitrite class. Since existing naval appropriations were not sufficient for the construction of this class, the Navy used funds set aside for repair and maintenance instead, by scrapping five old monitors and building five almost entirely new ones with the same names on the pretext of "repairing" the old ones. Roach received contracts for two of these ships—USS Miantonomoh (BM-5) and USS Puritan (BM-1), but when the Hayes administration came to power in 1877, it quickly canceled all the Amphitrite contracts except that for Miantonomoh which was already almost completed. Roach was left with an unpaid $200,000 bill on Puritan, and was forced to keep the unfinished vessel in his shipyard at his own expense until 1882 when the government finally appropriated funds for its completion.

=== Expansion of facilities ===
A U.S. shipbuilding boom beginning in 1880 encouraged many American shipyards to upgrade their facilities, and John Roach & Sons was no exception. In 1880, Roach expanded the facilities of the Chester Rolling Mill by adding a new blast furnace. The new furnace eventually allowed the production of 300 tons of steel weekly, in addition to the 700 tons of pig iron and 300 tons of iron plate the mill was already producing. Roach also added machinery to the mill for the rolling of steel plates.

Roach had recognized the growing demand for steel products in the U.S. economy, and in 1880 he established the Combination Steel and Iron Company downriver from his Chester shipyard, which began production in January 1881. He soon discovered however that U.S. steelmakers could not keep up with national demand, so he also established his own steel manufacturing company, the Standard Steel Casting Company, which began production early in 1884. All these new facilities would soon be utilized for supplying steel to his shipyard.

The facilities of the shipyard itself were also expanded in this period. In 1881, Roach added a number of hydraulic and pneumatic riveting machines to the yard—amongst the first such machines in the country. In the same year, he installed a private telegraph network to accelerate communications between his various plants, and he also installed an Edison electric lighting system at the yard which allowed longer working hours in winter and a second shift when required.

=== ABCD ships ===
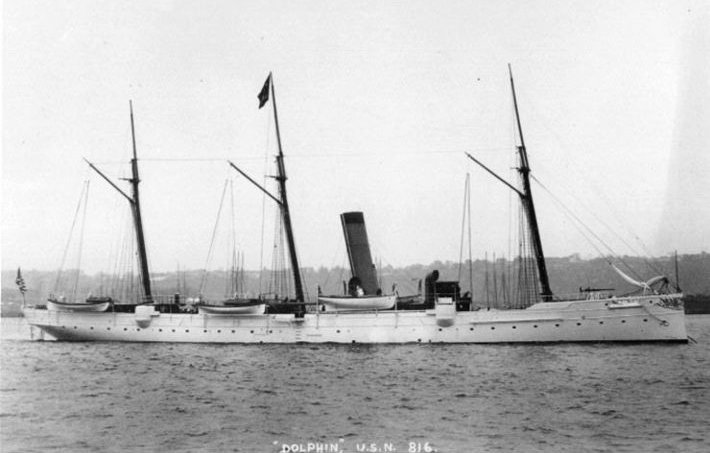
USS Dolphin. Delays in construction of the ship, followed by the government's voiding of the contract, forced John Roach & Sons into receivership in 1885.

The Garfield administration, which came to power in 1881, proved more sympathetic to the idea of revamping the dilapidated Navy than the previous administration. After many months of indecision, the government decided to go ahead with the completion of the earlier Amphitrite class, and additionally approved the construction of a new group of four all-steel warships, consisting of one 4,300-ton protected cruiser, two 3,000-ton cruisers and one dispatch vessel. These four ships would eventually become known as the "ABCD ships" after their names—Atlanta, Boston, Chicago and Dolphin.

The government issued public tenders for construction of the ships in June 1883, and on 3 July it was announced that John Roach & Sons had won all four contracts. Roach immediately went to work on construction of the ships, but continual design changes submitted by the Navy, in addition to shortages of the high quality steel demanded by Navy inspectors, soon had construction falling well behind schedule. Roach found himself faced with mounting financial losses. A fire in the shipyard and the loss of two steamers in which Roach had part ownership depleted cash reserves still further.

By the time the first ship to be completed, Dolphin, was ready for her final sea trials in early 1885, a new Democratic administration under Grover Cleveland had come to power. In spite of Dolphin passing her sea trials, the new administration, which suspected Roach of receiving favors from the previous Republican administration, found a pretext to declare the Dolphin contract void. Roach, by now a terminally ill old man, placed his company into receivership a short time later. He later explained that the voiding of the Dolphin contract made it impossible for him to secure a loan to continue his business since he still had another three Navy vessels on his slipways whose contracts might also be declared void.

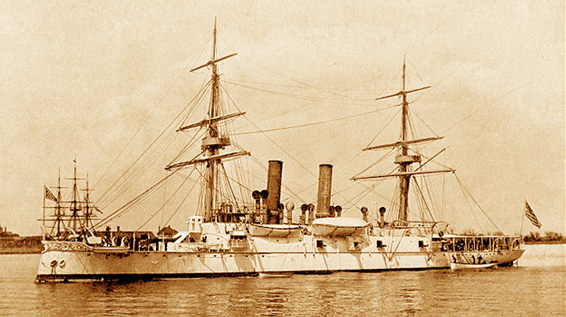
USS Atlanta, one of the three all-steel "ABCD" cruisers. The Navy took charge of the Roach shipyard for 22 months to finish these vessels, prompting a $330,000 lawsuit from the company.

Fearing a public backlash from the bankruptcy of the nation's biggest shipyard, Secretary of the Navy William Whitney moved quickly to limit the political damage. All four ABCD ship contracts were declared "valid but forfeit" since the shipbuilder had failed to complete the work in the allotted time. Navy officials subsequently took charge of the Roach shipyard and its workforce, and the remaining three vessels, USS Atlanta, USS Boston and USS Chicago, were completed over the next 22 months, during which time all other work at the shipyard was prohibited. The Roach family would later initiate a $330,151 lawsuit against the government for losses incurred by John Roach & Sons during this period. The case was finally settled in 1898 when the government made a special appropriation to pay the claim.

In spite of the heavy criticism initially levelled at them from many different quarters, the completion of the four ABCD ships—the Navy's first steel vessels—was later hailed as the "Birth of the New Navy", and all four vessels were to provide many years of reliable service.

== John Baker Roach Presidency, 1887–1907 ==
By August 1885, the receivers of John Roach & Sons, George E. Weed and George W. Quintard, had determined the company's total assets at approximately $4.6 million after writedowns, while its liabilities totaled about $2.6 million, leaving the company a net worth of approximately $2 million. The receivers then began selling assets to pay off the creditors, a process that took approximately eighteen months. During this period, John Roach Sr. died aged 71, on January 10, 1887.

After all the creditors had been paid, the Roach family found itself still in possession of the Delaware River Iron Ship Building and Engine Works in Chester and the Morgan Iron Works in New York, and they decided to continue in the shipbuilding business. John Baker Roach became President of the Chester shipyard, and the Morgan Iron Works was incorporated, with George E. Weed and John Baker Roach and his younger brothers Garrett and Stephen becoming president, vice-president, Secretary and Treasurer respectively.

From this point however, the Roach shipyard, which had lost both the dynamic leadership of John Roach Sr., and the network of companies previously supporting its operations, was to forfeit its position of pre-eminence in the American shipbuilding industry and never regain it. The shipyard of William Cramp & Sons, and later on, other shipyards, would soon supplant the Roach yard in terms of facilities and annual output.

In 1890 Roach and Weed twice attempted to float the business, including their Morgan Ironworks, on the London Stock Exchange. Roach's Shipbuilding & Engineering Co. Ltd. was registered. Of its proposed capital of £550,000 (about $2,750,000 at historic exchange rates), of which £400,000 ($2mn) was to purchased the business - it was alleged that the remainder would go to the promoters. The flotation failed, partly over this allegation, but also due to doubts over the value of the business; the Secretary of the Navy was also reported to have boycotted the company due to its foreign capital.

=== Ongoing customers ===
In the first years of John Baker Roach's presidency of the Delaware Works, the yard continued to enjoy the patronage of a number of former customers, including both the Ward Line and the Mallory Line. The shipyard completed the passenger freighters Leona (3,300 tons) and Concho (3,700 tons) for the Mallory Line in 1888 and 1891 respectively. After the death of Charles Mallory in 1890 however, the yard received no more Mallory Line orders until 1903, when it built the 6,069-ton passenger freighter San Jacinto. This latter vessel was the largest ship ever built at the yard under Roach management.

In 1898, the Ward Line also ordered three new ships, the 3,500 ton passenger freighters Yumuri, Orizaba and Yucatán, but these were the last ships ordered by the company, possibly because its fleet was requisitioned by the U.S. Navy during the Spanish–American War. The following year, the yard completed another two passenger freighters for the struggling U.S. and Brazil Mail Company, the 4,000-ton passenger freighters Seguranca and Vigilancia. These new vessels did not improve the Brazil Line's fortunes and it went bankrupt in 1893.

The Ocean Steamship Company also continued to be a major customer. Ocean Steamship ordered the 2,000-ton passenger freighter City of Birmingham in 1888. In the early 1900s the company ordered a number of new passenger freighters of about 5,000 tons, including City of Memphis, delivered in 1902, City of Macon (1903), and the sister ships City of Columbus and City of Atlanta (1904). The last ship built by the Delaware River Works was fittingly a vessel for Ocean Steamship, the 5,600-ton passenger freighter City of Savannah, delivered in August 1907.

In 1891, the yard built the hulls (under subcontract from N. F. Palmer & Co.) for two more U.S. Navy warships, the 1,710-ton gunboats USS Concord (PG-3) and USS Bennington (PG-4). These were the last warships built by the Delaware Works for the Navy.

=== New clients ===
Old Dominion Steamship Company ship list ca. 1880s.

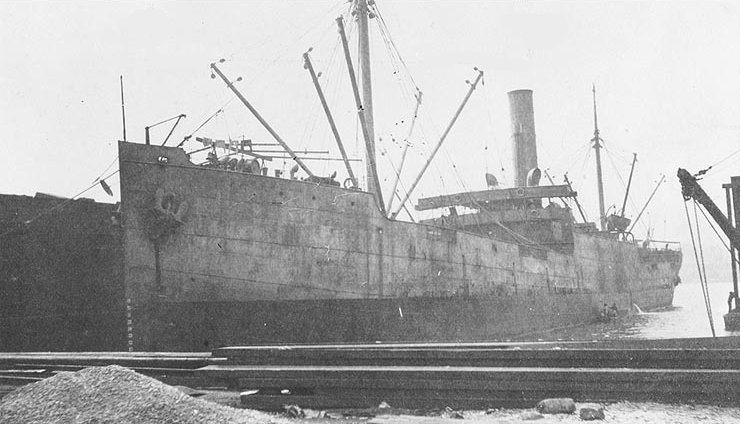
Oregonian, seen here prior to 1920.

The Delaware River Works also enjoyed the patronage of some new clients in these years. The Old Dominion Steamship Company, which had constructed SS George W. Elder in 1874 and Manhattan (1879), Breakwater (1880) then Guyandotte and Roanoke in 1882, became a major client in the 1890s, ordering five passenger freighters of about 3,000 tons including Jamestown and Yorktown, built in 1894, Princess Anne (1897), and the sister ships Hamilton and Jefferson, completed in 1899. Other new clients for passenger ships included the New England Steamboat Company, which ordered four sub-3,000-ton vessels from 1896, Mohawk, Mohegan, Pequonnock and New Haven, and the American-Hawaiian Steamship Company, which ordered three large passenger-freighters of about 5,600 tons, American, Hawaiian and Oregonian, all three of which were completed between 1900 and 1901.

Other repeat customers in this period included the Brooklyn & New York Ferry Company, which ordered six new ferries of about 800 tons between 1895 and 1898, the Standard Oil Company, which ordered four tank barges and/or oil tankers, and the Panama Railroad Company, which ordered half a dozen barges of about 300 tons between 1898 and 1902. Additionally, the yard completed a number of yachts for private clients.

=== Night boats ===
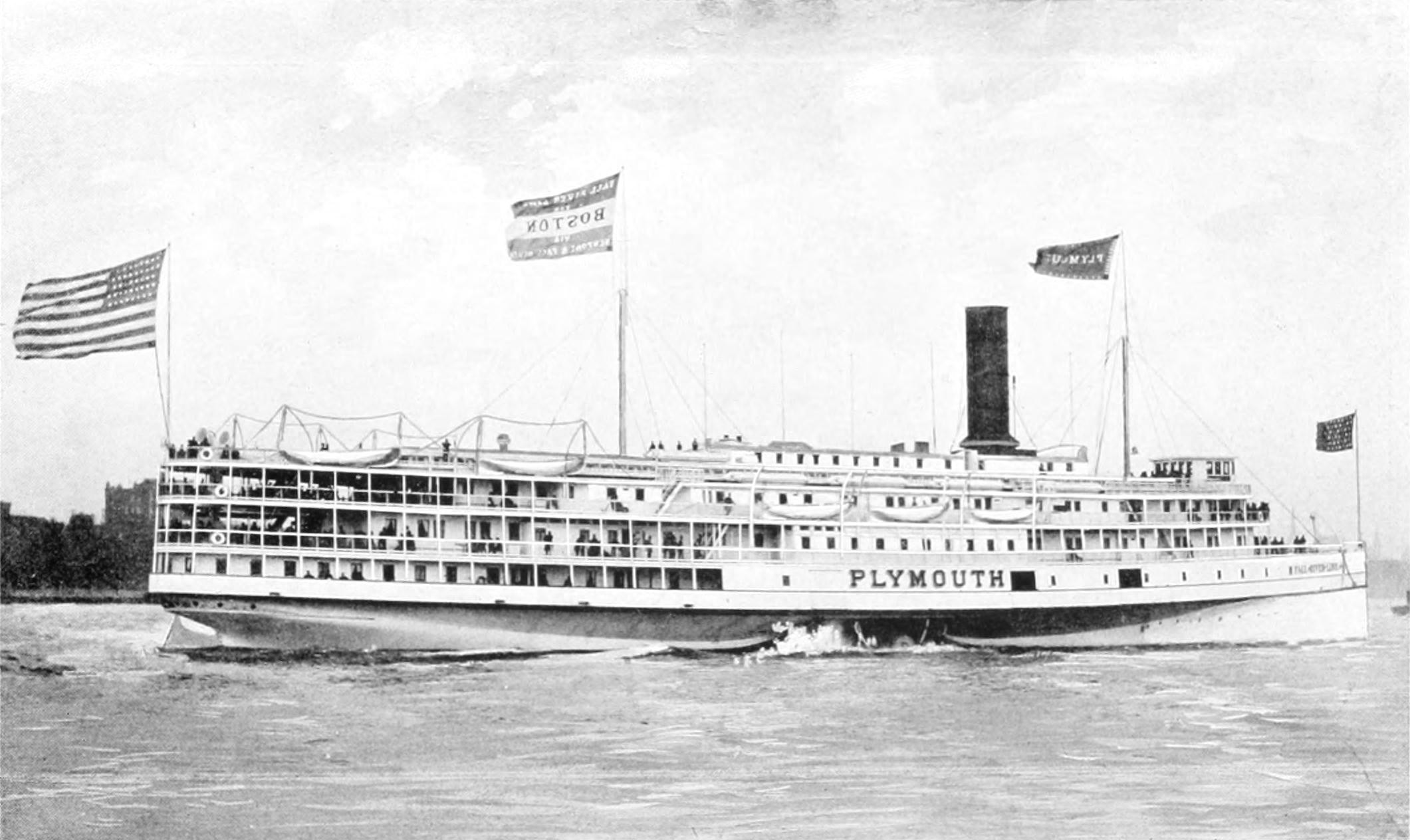
Plymouth, completed in 1889. She was one of three luxury "floating palaces" built by the Roach shipyard for the Fall River Line during John B. Roach's stewardship

Among the most notable vessels built by the Delaware River Works during John Baker Roach's presidency were the three "night boats" built for the Old Colony Steamship Company, owner of the Fall River Line which operated a steamboat service between New York and Massachusetts. The Line's steamboats—classic sidewheel steamers equipped with sleeping berths for overnight journeys (hence the term "night boat")—maintained a tradition of opulence that earned them the title of "floating palaces".

The Roach family had a long-established connection with the Fall River Line, as John Roach Sr.—while head of the Etna Iron Works in New York in the 1860s—had supplied the engines for two of the Line's most celebrated steamboats, Bristol and Providence. These engines, with their massive 110-inch (280 cm) cylinders, were at the time the largest engines built in the United States. Roach Sr. had also built the sidewheel steamer Pilgrim for the Line in 1883.

The three night boats subsequently built for the Old Colony Steamboat Company during John B. Roach's stewardship were not directly contracted to the Roach shipyard itself but to the engine-building firm of W. & A. Fletcher Co., which designed and built their engines and subcontracted with the Delaware Works for construction of the hulls. All three boats were designed by the Fall River Line's in-house naval architect, George Pierce.

The first of these three boats, the 4,600-ton Puritan, built in 1887, was fitted with the largest walking beam engine ever built. She was also the first steamboat built for service on Long Island Sound to have a steel hull. The second was a smaller vessel, the 3,800-ton Plymouth, built in 1889. As it was decided that the walking beam engine had reached its practical limit in Puritan, Plymouth was installed with a more modern triple expansion engine instead. The last of the three vessels was the 5,300-ton Priscilla, built in 1894, which had a double compound engine and Scotch boilers. All three of these vessels were considered in their day to be the epitome of elegance and sophistication and gave many years of service on Long Island Sound.

=== Turbine-powered steamships ===
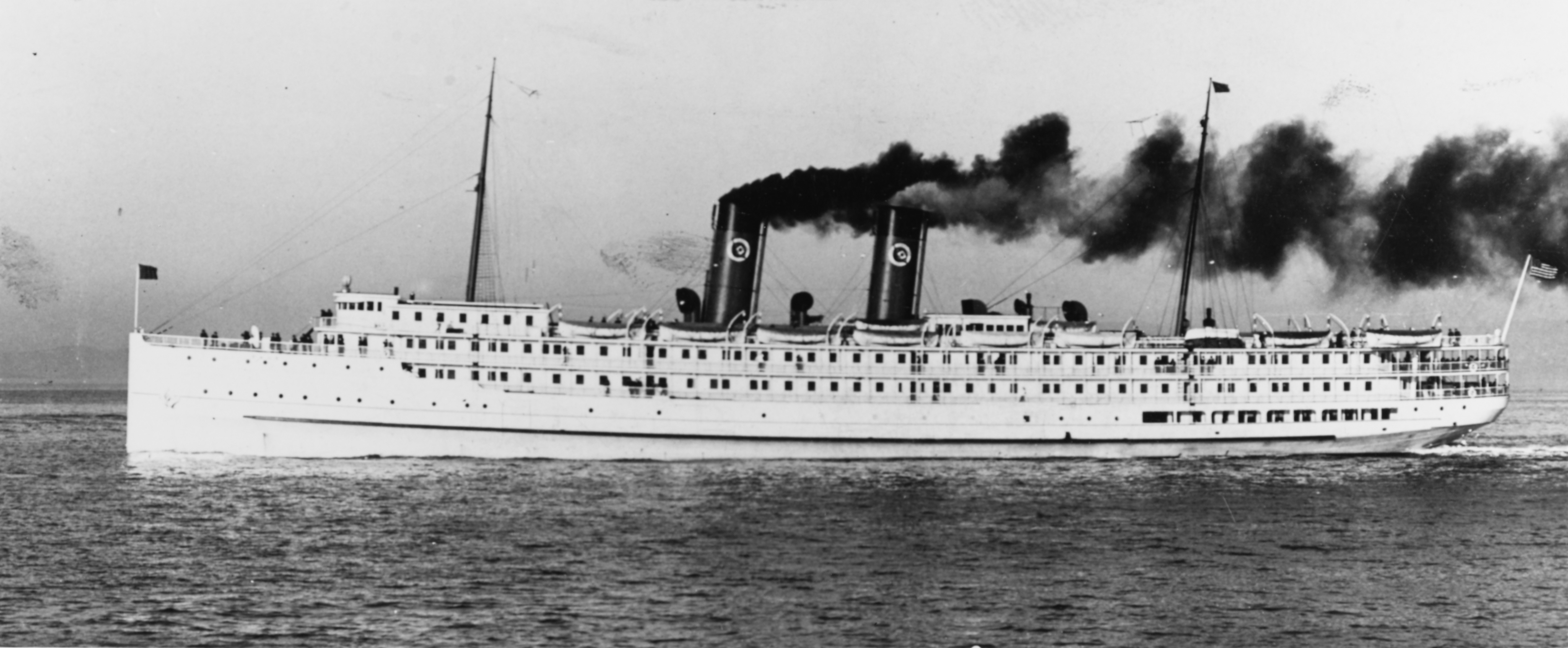
SS Yale. Completed in 1907, the turbine-powered Yale and her sister ship Harvard were the fastest American-flagged steamships afloat.

Amongst the last notable steamships built by the Delaware River Works were the three turbine-powered steamships Governor Cobb, Yale and Harvard. As with the Fall River Line night boats, these vessels were contracted for by W. & A. Fletcher Co., which built the ships' engines and subcontracted with the Roach yard for construction of the hulls.

These ships are notable for being the first three U.S.-built ships to be powered by steam turbines. Design of the engines was licensed by W. & A. Fletcher from the Parsons Marine Steam Turbine Company, inventor of the turbine engine. Governor Cobb, a 2,700 ton passenger steamer built in 1906 for the Boston-New Brunswick trade, has the double distinction of being not only America's first turbine-powered vessel, but also of eventually becoming the world's first helicopter carrier. The ship had a top speed of 17 knots (31 km/h). The 3,750-ton sister ships Yale and Harvard—built in 1907 for the Metropolitan Steamship Company, which operated them between New York and Boston—had a top speed of 23 knots (43 km/h) and when first entering service were the fastest American-flagged vessels afloat.

== Later history ==
After the death of John Baker Roach in 1908, the Roach family heirs decided not to continue the business. The shipyard lay idle for some years until being leased in about 1913 by an engineer and former naval officer, C. P. M. Jack, who used the yard for converting old freighters into oil tankers. Jack's pioneering method of building ships from prefabricated components would later be widely adopted in the industry.

In 1917, railroad heir W. Averell Harriman, anticipating America's entry in World War I, purchased the shipyard to build merchant ships for the war effort, renaming it the Merchant Shipbuilding Corporation. Between 1917 and 1923, Harriman built about 40 merchant ships of various kinds at the yard. Merchant Shipbuilding was closed permanently in 1923 due to the postwar shipbuilding slump.

== Production summary, 1871–1907 ==
=== Commercial and private vessels ===
The overwhelming majority of ships built by the Delaware River Iron Ship Building and Engine Works were merchant ships, i.e. for commercial use. A handful of the smaller vessels, particularly the yachts, were for private use. Warships are covered in a separate section.

John Roach presidency, 1871–1887
Ship type	No. built	Gross tonnage			
Ship type	No. built	Smallest	Largest	Average	Total
Passenger freighter	58	1,486	5,080	2,529	146,683
Cargo ship	13	412	2,033	1018	13,236
Ferry	6	300	993	806	4,838
Yacht	4	17	482	203	812
Barge	3	170	170	170	510 (Note: The tonnage of one barge is unknown. It is assumed to have been 170 tons like the two built by the yard at around the same time.)
Tug	2	30	80	55	110
Waterboat	2	85	85	85	170
Tender	1	105	105	105	105
SUMMARY:	89	17	5,080	1,870	166,464

John Baker Roach presidency, 1887–1907
Ship type	No. built	Gross tonnage			
Ship type	No. built	Smallest	Largest	Average	Total
Passenger freighter	32	1,352	6,069	3,764	120,443
Yacht	11	80	259	172	1,890
Passenger	10	704	5,292	3,374	33,737
Ferry	8	569	1,306	910	7,279
Barge	7	286	300	296	2,072
Cargo ship	4	419	1,159	628	2,512
Tank barge	3	598	1,644	1,208	3,263
Tug	3	129	169	151	452
Tanker	1	1,942	1,942	1,942	1,942
SUMMARY:	79	80	6,069	2,197	173,590

Total commercial/private production, 1871–1907
Ship type	No. built	Gross tonnage			
Ship type	No. built	Smallest	Largest	Average	Total
Passenger freighter	90	1,352	6,069	2,966	267,126
Cargo ship	17	412	2,033	926	15,748
Yacht	15	17	482	180	2,702
Ferry	14	300	1,306	867	12,117
Passenger	10	704	5,292	3,374	33,737
Barge	10	170	300	258	2,582
Tug	5	30	169	112	562
Tank barge	3	598	1,644	1088	3,263
Waterboat	2	85	85	85	170
Tanker	1	1,942	1,942	1,942	1,942
Tender	1	105	105	105	105
SUMMARY:	168	17	6,069	2,024	340,054

Sources: Swann pp. 239–241, shipbuildinghistory.com.

=== Warships ===
All warships were built for the U.S. Navy with the exception of the small gunboat Graciosa, which was built for the Spanish Navy. Ships are listed in order of launch date, or in the case of refitted vessels (second table) by the date on which the refit began.

In addition to the vessels listed below, the Roach yard also built the Presidential yacht USS Sylph (PY-5), but since she was not a warship she is listed with the other yachts in the "commercial and private" section above.

Warships—new
Ship	Type	Launch	Commission	Disp. (tons)
USS Alert (AS-4)	Gunboat	1874	1875	1,020
USS Huron	Gunboat	1875	1875	1,020
Graciosa (Spanish Navy)	Gunboat	1875	N/A	72
USS Miantonomoh (BM-5)	Monitor	1876	1882	3,990
USS Puritan (BM-1)	Monitor	1882	1896	6,060
USS Dolphin	Gunboat	1884	1885	1,510
USS Atlanta	Protected cruiser	1884	1886	3,189
USS Boston	Protected cruiser	1884	1887	3,189
USS Chicago	Protected cruiser	1885	1889	4,842
USS Bennington (PG-4)	Gunboat	1890	1891	1,700
USS Concord (PG-3)	Gunboat	1891	1909	1,710
SUMMARY:		1874–1891	1875–1901	28,413

Warships—original engine supply or re-engine and refit
Ship	Type	Launch	Fit/refit	Disp. (tons)
USS Tennessee (Note: USS Tennessee was actually re-engined at Roach's New York facility, the Morgan Iron Works, but it is included in this table for completeness.)	Screw frigate	1865	1869	3,281
USS Mistletoe	Gunboat	1872	1873 (Note: This was apparently the original engine for this vessel.)	455
USS Wyandotte	Monitor	1864	1873	3,189
USS Nahant	Monitor	1862	1873	4,842
USS Jason	Monitor	1862	1874	1,700
USS Passaic	Monitor	1862	1874	1,710
USS Ranger	Gunboat	1876	1874 (Note: As this was the only USS Ranger with the Navy at the time, it is assumed that John Roach & Sons built the engine for the new vessel prior to its launch at Harlan & Hollingworth in 1876.)	1,020
SUMMARY:		1865–1876	1869–1874	16,191

Total warship production—new
Ship type	No. built	Displacement (tons)			
Ship type	No. built	Smallest	Largest	Average	Total
Protected cruiser	3	3,240	4,842	3,774	11,322
Monitor	2	3,990	6,060	5,025	10,050
Gunboat	5	1,020	1,710	1,414	6,969
Gunboat (Spanish Navy)	1	72	72	72	72
SUMMARY:	11	72	6,060	2,843	28,413

Sources: Swann, pp. 239–241, Dictionary of American Naval Fighting Ships.

=== Total production, 1871–1907 ===
The following table represents the total ship production of the Delaware River Iron Ship Building and Engine Works from the company's establishment in 1871 to its final closure in 1908. In addition to the ships listed here, the company manufactured a number of engines for warships built elsewhere (listed in a previous table), and it also built a sectional dry dock for the Pensacola Navy Yard.

Total production—commercial, private and warships 1871-1907
Shipyard presidency	Ship type		Total ships	Gross tonnage
Shipyard presidency	Comm/private	Warships	Total ships	Gross tonnage
John Roach	89	9	98	191,467
John Baker Roach	79	2	81	177,000
TOTAL	168	11	179	368,467

Sources: Swann, pp. 239–242, shipbuildinghistory.com, Dictionary of American Naval Fighting Ships.

== See also ==
- John Roach & Sons
- Reaney, Son & Archbold
- Merchant Shipbuilding Corporation
