= SS Monroe =

SS Monroe may refer to one of the following

- SS Monroe (1902), an Old Dominion Line steamship sunk in 1914 collision.
- SS Monroe (1920), a Design 1025 ship built at Newburgh Shipyards Inc., Newburgh, New York and scrapped 1954.

== See also ==
- SS Monroe Victory (1945), a Victory ship.
