= USS Sylph (PY-5) =

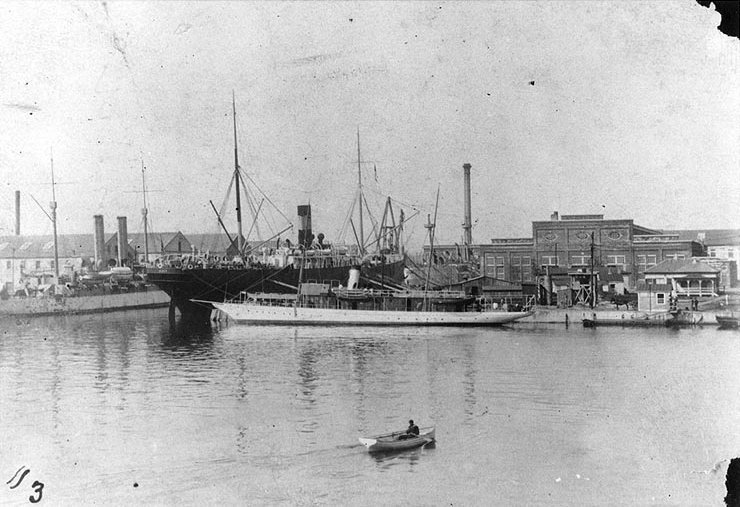
- USS Sylph (front center) at the Norfolk Naval Shipyard, c. late 1905

History

United States
- Name: Sylph
- Namesake: Sylph
- Builder: John Roach & Company, Chester, Pennsylvania
- Yard number: 295
- Completed: 1898
- Acquired: June 1898
- Commissioned: 18 Aug 1898
- Decommissioned: 27 Apr 1929
- Identification: U.S. Official Number: 229468
- Fate: Sold 1929, party fishing boat, 1939 ferry. Abandoned Sea Gate, Brooklyn.

General characteristics
- Type: Steam yacht
- Tonnage: 149 GRT, 101 NRT (1931)
- Displacement: 152 tons
- Length: 152 ft (46.3 m) (extreme); 123 ft 8 in (37.7 m) (waterline); 136 ft (41.5 m) (registry)
- Beam: 20 ft (6.1 m)
- Draft: 7 ft 6 in (2.3 m) (Navy); 8 ft 9 in (2.7 m) (builder's)
- Depth: 10 ft 6 in (3.2 m)
- Installed power: 2 Almay boilers. 600 i.h.p.
- Propulsion: Vertical triple expansion steam engine, single screw, at unknown date replaced by diesel
- Speed: 15 kn (17 mph; 28 km/h)
- Complement: 3 officers, 32 men
- Crew: 7 (1931 passenger service)
- Notes: The steam engine was replaced by a 400hp Worthington diesel engine at a so far undetermined date, though possibly 1935 while in operation as a party fishing boat. (Note: NavSource notes the ferry service defaulted on a note to "Worthington Diesel Company" and that company took possession before abandonment.)

USS Sylph (PY-5) was a steel hulled steam yacht that served as a presidential yacht operating from the Washington Navy Yard from the late 19th century through the presidency of Woodrow Wilson. Afterwards the yacht was used by the secretary of the Navy and assistant secretary of the Navy. After decommissioning and sale in 1929 the yacht was used as a party fishing boat in New York and later a ferry. Sometime around 1950 the line went out of business and the vessel was abandoned at a pier at West 37th Street, Sea Gate, Brooklyn (40°34′20.1″N 74°0′08.5″W). The pier and abandoned vessel were reduced by fire and storms to the waterline and wreckage in the sands which still may be exposed by storms.

== Construction ==
The yacht was designed by Gardner and Cox of New York and under construction as hull 295 by Delaware River Iron Shipbuilding and Engine Works (also known as John Roach & Company), of Chester, Pennsylvania The Navy inspected the vessel before completion and purchased it contingent on a guarantee of a speed of 15 kn (17 mph; 28 km/h). The builder agreed even though the original design speed was 14 kn (16 mph; 26 km/h). The builder specifications were extreme length of 152 ft (46.3 m), 20 ft (6.1 m) beam, 10 ft 6 in (3.2 m) depth and draft of 8 ft 9 in (2.7 m). A number of structural changes were required to make the change from a prospective pleasure yacht to a naval gunboat. Guest staterooms were converted to into crew space and magazines and other naval space requirements. Two Almay water tube boilers provided steam for the vertical triple expansion steam engine. The engine out performed the guarantee requirement and averaged 16 kn (18 mph; 30 km/h) over six hours during trials with an indicated 600 horsepower with a low rate of coal consumption. Coal capacity was 50 tons. A three bladed 6 ft 3 in (1.9 m) steel propeller drove the yacht. A General Electric dynamo, located in the engine room was rated at illumination of 100 16 candle power lights. Equipped for blockade duty the patrol yacht mounted a 6 pounder on both bow and stern with a 3 pounder broadside gun on each side. Ammunition storage was fore and aft below the water line. (Note: Page 3 of the reference contains a profile and accommodation plan for the yacht.)

== Service history ==
Sylph was commissioned on 18 August 1898 at the Norfolk Navy Yard. She was the third U.S. Navy ship to bear the name.

Sylph sometime between 1919 and 1921.

Soon after commissioning, Sylph was assigned to the Washington Navy Yard, where she served as a yacht for the President and other high officials. President McKinley was the first President to use her. In 1902, she began alternating with first Dolphin then Mayflower as the President's yacht, and she also served the Secretary and Assistant Secretary of the Navy in the same manner. President Theodore Roosevelt frequently cruised in Sylph to his home at Oyster Bay, New York, and President William Howard Taft used her for excursions off the New England coast during the summers of his term.

The yacht was assigned to take President Taft's sister-in-law, Eleanor More who had been caring for Mrs. Taft after a stroke, to visit her summer cottage at Biddeford Pool off Saco Bay in Maine. On the evening of 30 July 1909 Sylph anchored off the mouth of the Saco River. Capt. Earnest Vinton of Saco sold tickets for a moonlight sightseeing trip to the yacht. On arrival at the lit yacht passengers gathered on the port side of the overloaded motor launch Item causing it to capsize. The commander of Sylph ordered its tender to the rescue and turned searchlights on the area. Three of the passengers were lost, one dying after rescue, with one body recovered two weeks later. A coroner's inquiry revealed that Item was designed for an engine weighing more than two tons but that engine had been replaced by one only 10% of the weight making the vessel unstable and unsafe for carrying passengers. No charges were filed as Vinton had complied with the only regulations in effect for life jackets.

More often, Sylph cruised up and down the Potomac River, near Washington, D.C. She went on sightseeing excursions in Chesapeake Bay and to George Washington's home at Mount Vernon, Virginia, on the Potomac just below Washington. Among her famous passengers, the yacht numbered the King of Belgium and the Crown Prince of Sweden.

Woodrow Wilson was the last President to use Sylph as the presidential yacht. After his term of office, she operated from the Washington Navy Yard for the Secretary and Assistant Secretary of the Navy and often marked pleasure cruises to Mount Vernon with patients of the Naval Hospital embarked.

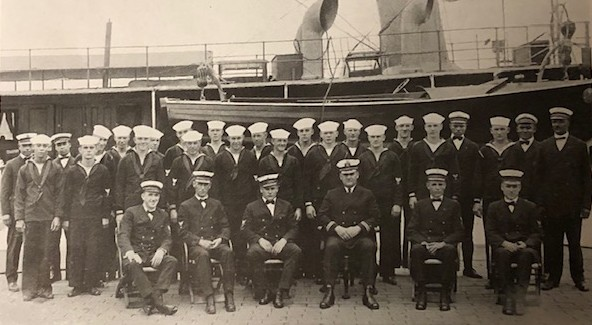
USS SYLPH, 21 April 1921,photo shows crew at WNY decommissioning ceremony

On 24 January 1921, she was called upon to carry the body of the late minister of Sweden down the Potomac and through the over Chesapeake Bay to Hampton Roads. On 12 October 1935 Franklin D. Roosevelt recounted in his message regarding the restoration of Stratford Hall a trip he made during his service in the Wilson Administration (Assistant Secretary of the Navy (1913–1919)) with a group traveling aboard "the small Presidential Yacht Sylph" to visit the ruin of the plantation "at an apparently uninhabited section of the lower Potomac."

Sylph continued in special service at Washington throughout her career. On 17 July 1921, she received the alphanumeric designation, PY-5. She continued to cross the Potomac and Anacostia Rivers until 19 November 1928, when she moored at the Washington Navy Yard to remain for the rest of her career. The USS Sylph was slated for decommissioning in 1921, but this was later rescinded by order of the Secretary of the Navy.This decision was welcomed news for the Washington Navy Yard workforce who in the 1921 lauded her record for "affording our government a wonderful means of entertaining foreign delegation's... Her record for the past year has surpassed all previous years." They went on to note "She is a happy little craft and example of the best, and has but one slogan, SERVICE."

On 2 April 1929, Sylph was taken in tow to Norfolk, Virginia. On the 27th, she was decommissioned there, and her name was struck from the Navy list two days later. On 26 November 1929, her hulk was sold to Mr. Frank B. Clair of Brooklyn, New York.

=== Civilian vessel ===
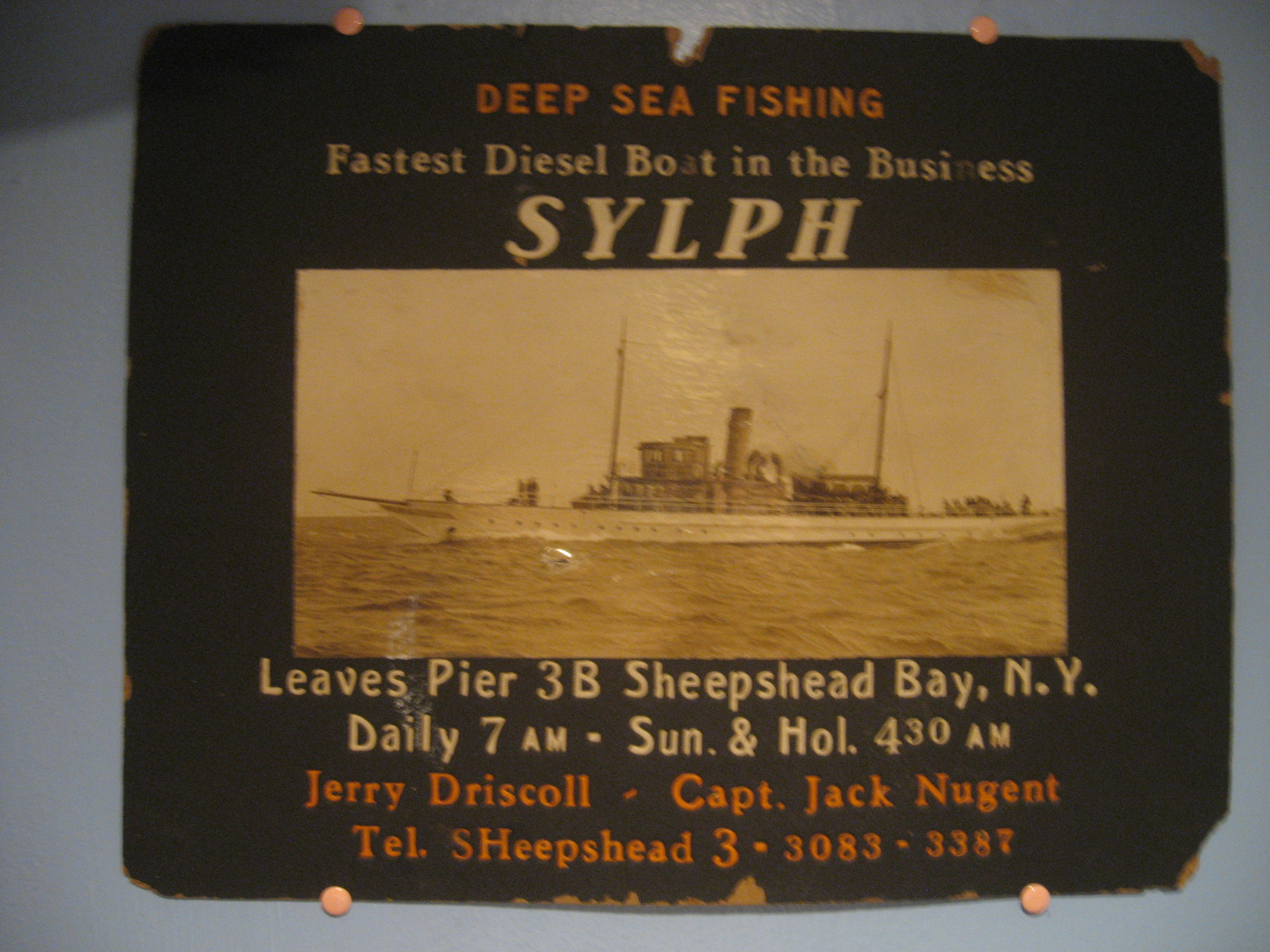
Advertisement for fishing on the Sylph

Sylph first served as a deep sea party fishing vessel, open to the public and operating out of Sheepshead Bay, Brooklyn. The 1931 U.S. registry shows owner being Frank P. Clair, in passenger service with a crew of 7 registered at New York, N.Y. The vessel's registered data was 149 GRT, 101 NRT, 136 ft (41.5 m) registry length, 19.8 ft (6.0 m) beam with a depth of 10.4 ft (3.2 m) and 550 horsepower. In 1939 Sylph became a ferry making scheduled commuter runs from Manhattan to Sea Gate, Brooklyn until about 1950 when the service and vessel were abandoned. (Note: The 1939 U.S. register shows the vessel's owner as John W. Nugent.) New York Waterways and Yacht Cruises was the operator 1939 to 1943 when the vessel went out of documentation. The ferry was abandoned at the pier at West 37th Street, Brooklyn. The abandoned vessel was intact until storms and fires leveled the pier and wreck to the waterline. Some remains are still visible after storms shift sands that normally cover the remnants.

Owners Frank B. Clair and the 1939 registered owner, John W. Nugent, were owners of the vessel through both the fishing and ferry enterprise. At some point they apparently borrowed from the Worthington Diesel Company and converted from steam engine to a Worthington diesel. In 1941 they defaulted and Worthington took possession of the vessel which apparently it later abandoned.
