= Alaskan (1883 steamship) =

Columbia River and Puget Sound steamship

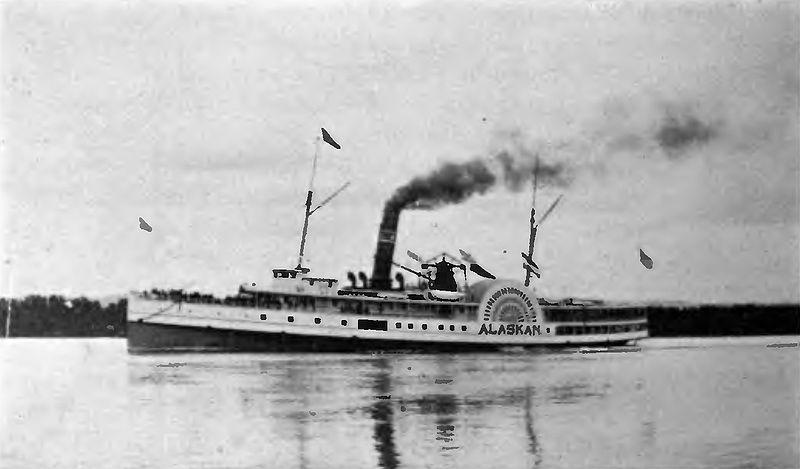

History
- Name: Alaskan
- Owner: Oregon Railway and Navigation Company
- Route: Columbia River, Puget Sound
- Builder: Delaware River Iron Ship Building and Engine Works
- Cost: $350,000
- Launched: August 8, 1883
- Completed: 1883
- In service: April 6, 1884
- Fate: Foundered May 12, 1889
- Notes: iron hull, built in Chester, Pennsylvania

General characteristics
- Type: Inland steamship
- Tonnage: 1718
- Length: 276 ft (84 m)
- Beam: 39.6 ft (12.1 m)
- Depth: 14.5 ft (4.4 m) depth of hold
- Decks: three (freight, passenger, hurricane)
- Installed power: Coal-fired boiler, single-cylinder walking beam engine
- Propulsion: sidewheels
- Sail plan: schooner (auxiliary)
- Notes: Near sistership to Olympian

Alaskan was a steamship operated from 1884 to 1889 on the Columbia River and Puget Sound. She was the first steamship built in the United States to have a steel-plated hull. Alaskan and her near-sistership Olympian were known as "Henry Villard's White Elephants." There were a number of vessels named Alaska and Alaskan, this large side-wheel steamboat should not be confused with them.

== Construction ==
Alaskan was built in 1883 by the Delaware River Iron Ship Building and Engine Works shipyard in Chester, Pennsylvania. She was a sidewheeler driven by a single cylinder vertical condensing walking-beam steam engine, which gave her high speed. Her iron hull was 276 feet (84 m) long, and she was rated at 1718 tons. She was built primarily for service on Puget Sound.

== Operations in Pacific Northwest ==
In 1884, Alaskan was brought to the Pacific Northwest through the Strait of Magellan, around South America. Alaskan and Olympian were built to designs popular and successful on Chesapeake Bay. When she arrived in the Pacific Northwest this design proved unsuited for the conditions, and the ship became a steady money loser. Timmen, one of the leading marine historians of the Pacific Northwest, states of Henry Villard that "[t]his financial genius, who once monopolized the Northwest's rail and water transportation, must have suffered a lapse of common sense when he ordered the pair constructed in Delaware."

=== Columbia River service ===
Villard's company, the Oregon Railway and Navigation Company first placed Alaskan in service on the Columbia River, where because of her huge size, she could only operate on the deeper water from Portland to Astoria. Her first set of officers included master Capt. James W. Troup (1856–1932), pilot Archie Pease, and engineer Thomas Smith. Alaskan's chief rival on this route was U.B. Scott's Telephone, supposedly then the fastest steamboat in the world. Occasionally the highly skilled Troup and Pease were able to outrun Telephone, then under the command of the equally-skilled river veterans Capt. William H. Whitcomb (1851–1924) and chief engineer Newton Scott. Both Alaskan and Olympian proved too expensive to operate on the Columbia River. The main problem was that they consumed huge quantities of expensive coal.

=== Puget Sound service ===
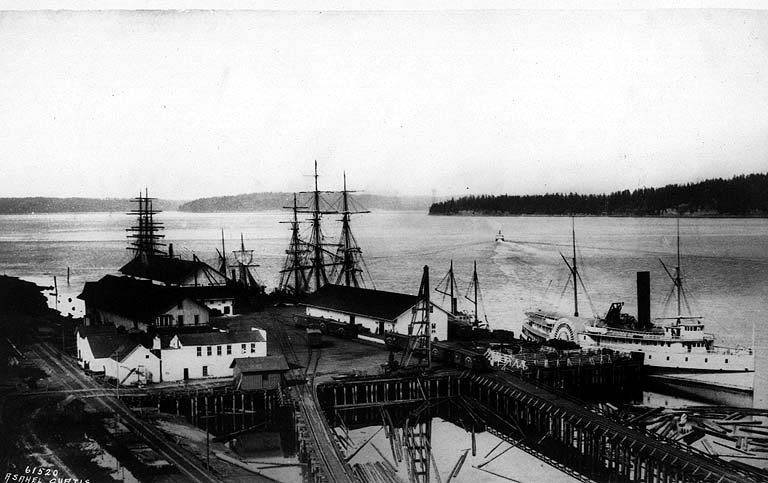
Alaskan at dock of Northern Pacific Railway at Tacoma, W.T. circa 1880

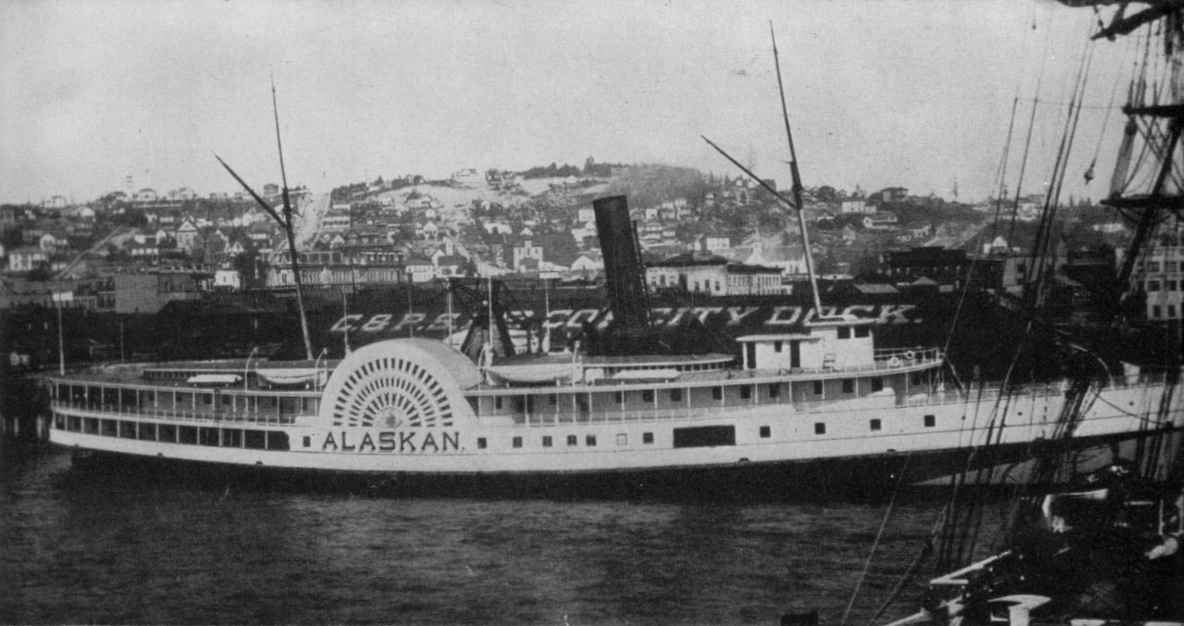
Alaskan moored at Seattle

In 1888, unable to make a profit on the Columbia, O.R. & N transferred Alaskan to Puget Sound where together with Olympian she ran from Tacoma, Seattle, and Port Townsend to Victoria and back. She served on this route until 1889.

=== Need for drydocking ===
In 1889, Alaskan needed underwater work and maintenance on her hull. However there were no drydocks in the Pacific Northwest. Instead there were only wooden "gridirons", enormous frames of wood weighted down with rocks placed on a beach or mudflat. When work was needed below the waterline of a vessel, the procedure was simply to float the ship over the gridiron, wait for the tide to run out, and work on the vessel as fast as possible before the tide came back in. No gridiron in the Pacific Northwest was big enough to handle Alaskan, so the decision was made to run her down to San Francisco.

== Sinking ==
Alaskan left Puget Sound, sailing around the Olympic Peninsula, then up the Columbia and Willamette rivers to Portland. With Capt. R.E. Howes in command, Alaskan then ran back down the Columbia, crossed over the Columbia Bar at 11:30 a.m. on Saturday, May 11, 1889, then turned south for San Francisco at 9 knots (17 km/h). She ran about 18 miles (29 km) off the coast in ballast—carrying no freight or passengers though many had applied—with 34 persons on board. She ran all night, passing the Yaquina Head Lighthouse at 11:00 p.m. running 14 miles (23 km) off shore. Weather conditions were good: light wind and rain showers, and the barometer holding steady.

By Sunday morning, the wind and wave height had increased. The ship was laboring heavily through the rolling waves 18 miles (29 km) offshore at 43.5°N 124.6°W. Alaskan had never been intended to run as an ocean vessel, and she had been worn out by hard driving on the Columbia River. By 3:00 p.m. off Cape Blanco she was in serious trouble as the sidewheels moved at "dead slow" and green water came in over the bow. The ship could not maintain direction, as a wave would lift one side and its paddle out of the water, then another, so that little or no forward progress could be made.

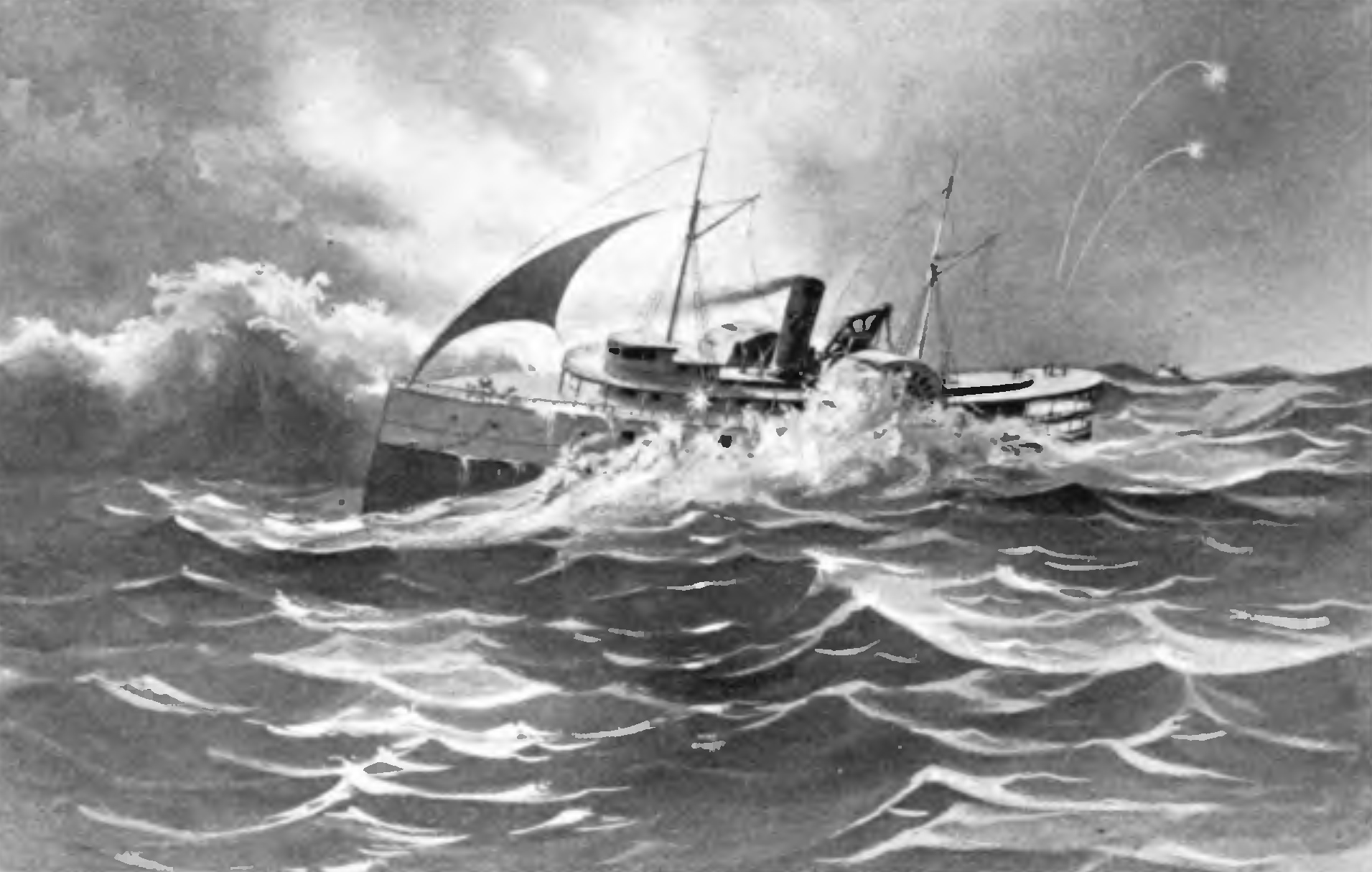
painting depicting sinking of Alaskan

The aftercabin worked loose with the securing bolts pulled through the planking. Second Officer Weeks and the crew tried to shove blankets and ticking into the holes to stop the leaks, but the vessel still kept shipping additional tons of water. The ship continued to gradually come apart under the stress. Her iron hull was not breached but her wooden upper works were being torn away by waves.

By 6:00 p.m. her condition became irretrievable when the port side paddle box tore away, leaving numerous holes in the hull. The water rose in the hold faster than the pumps could work. By midnight, the boiler fire was extinguished and Alaskan lost all power save for an emergency sail rigged earlier to keep her steadier in the wind.

Captain Howes ordered the ship's boats to be launched and towed behind the vessel on a line. Three of the four boats were successfully launched this way, and most of the crew were successfully evacuated, save only five men: Captain Howes, the chief engineer, the second mate, steward Al Rahles, and seaman Denny. As the boats were being launched, the crew saw a light from another ship, and desperately launched two distress rockets to ask for assistance. As the evacuation was going on, a wave broke over the deck and sucked Quartermaster (the seaman who actually steers the ship) Shielderup into the now-exposed side wheel where he was horribly mangled. At about 1:00 a.m. on Monday morning, the ship seemed to be going down so they cut the line to the boats. There was then no way off the Alaskan for the five men left on board.

The ship stayed afloat for about another hour and a half. Captain Howes and chief engineer Swain ended up clinging to a fragment of the deck. The pilot house floated by, with three men hanging on to it. Against the captain's advice, the chief struck out swimming for them, but never made it and was not seen again.

== Rescue of survivors ==
The tug Vigilant, moving slowly because of her tow—a manned barge—had seen the Alaskan's distress rockets, and arrived at the scene Monday evening, when she picked up the three men from the pilot house, and one living man and one dead from a life raft. Vigilant found Captain Howes still hanging on to the deck fragment, which had been gradually getting smaller as seas tore off pieces. He was taken on board after 33 hours in the water. Vigilant picked up the men from the first boat, with the ship's mate on board. A second boat reached shore, but the third boat was never seen again. Quartermaster Shieldrup was picked up alive, his leg nearly severed. He died a short while later and was buried at sea. News accounts said 21 people were lost, although there may have been undocumented stowaways drowned as well. The ship was insured for $200,000. Captain Howes and his remaining crew were later returned Astoria by the coastal passenger liner Columbia, also operated by O.R. & N.

== See also ==
- Olympian (sidewheeler)
