= USS Oregonian =

Cargo ship of the United States Navy

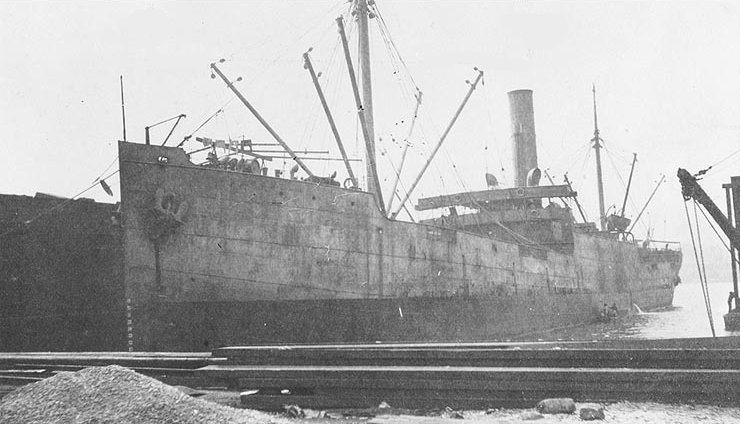
- SS Oregonian, either before or after her 1918-1919 U.S. Navy service as USS Oregonian (ID-1323)

History

United States
- Name: USS Oregonian
- Namesake: Previous name retained
- Builder: Delaware River Iron Shipbuilding and Engine Works, Chester, Pennsylvania
- Launched: 4 March 1901
- Acquired: 15 August 1918
- Commissioned: 17 August 1918
- Decommissioned: 15 April 1919
- Fate: Returned to owners 1919
- Notes: Operated as commercial cargo ship SS Oregonian both before and after her U.S. Navy service

General characteristics
- Type: Cargo ship
- Tonnage: 5,648 Gross register tons
- Displacement: 8,850 tons
- Length: 430 ft 0 in (131.06 m)
- Beam: 51 ft 1 in (15.57 m)
- Draft: 28 ft 0 in (8.53 m)
- Speed: 10.5 knots
- Complement: 112
- Armament: 1 × 3-inch (76.2-millimeter) gun

USS Oregonian (ID-1323) was a cargo ship that served in the United States Navy from 1918 to 1919.

Oregonian was built by the Delaware River Iron Shipbuilding and Engine Works in Chester, Pennsylvania and launched in 1901. At the time of her acquisition by the United States Government on 15 August 1918 she was operated by the American-Hawaiian Steamship Company.

Oregonian was assigned Id. No. 1323 and commissioned into the Naval Overseas Transportation Service (NOTS) on 17 August 1918 at Norfolk, Virginia. After refitting and arming, she took on general cargo, joined a convoy out of Norfolk on 22 August 1918, and arrived at Brest, France, on 11 September 1918. Steaming on to St. Nazaire, France, she discharged her cargo and sailed from Le Verdon-sur-Mer, France, in convoy on 30 September 1918, arriving at New York City on 16 October 1918.

Oregonian subsequently made two more Atlantic crossings. The first was to La Pallice, Bordeaux, and Le Verdon-sur-Mer, France, returning to New York on 13 December 1918, and the second to the Mediterranean in January 1919. Following delivery of her cargo at Trieste, she returned to New York, arriving on 26 March 1919.

Ordered demobilized and returned to her owners, she decommissioned on 15 April 1919 at Brooklyn, New York.
