= USS Quinnebaug (SP-1687) =

United States naval vessel

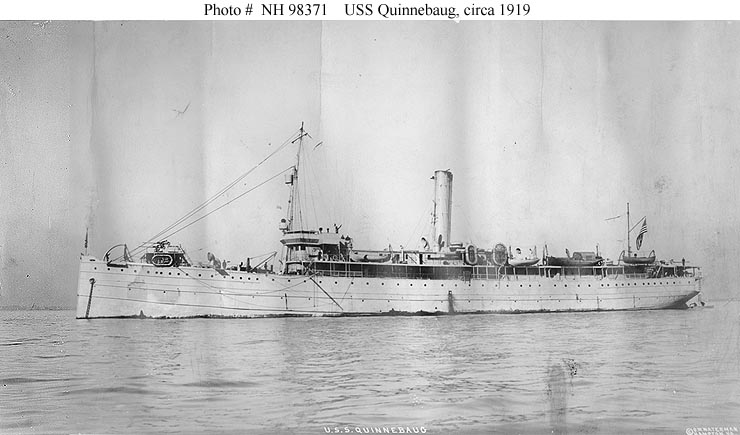
- USS Quinnebaug (ID-1687) 1919

History

United States
- Name: Jefferson; USS Quinnebaug; Jefferson
- Builder: John Roach & Sons, Delaware River Iron Ship Building and Engine Works, Chester, Pennsylvania
- Launched: 14 October 1898
- Completed: June 1899
- Commissioned: 28 March 1918
- Decommissioned: 6 February 1919
- Identification: O/N 77356

General characteristics
- Type: Minelayer (in 1918)
- Displacement: 5,150 tons
- Length: 375 ft (114 m)
- Beam: 42 ft (13 m)
- Draft: 18.5 ft (5.6 m)
- Speed: 16 knots
- Capacity: 612 mines (642 max)
- Crew: 18 officers and 392 men
- Armament: 1 × 5"/51 caliber gun; 2 × 3"/23 caliber guns

The third USS Quinnebaug was originally the Old Dominion Steamship Company Jefferson built by the Delaware River Iron Ship Building and Engine Works, Chester, Pennsylvania. She was launched on 14 October 1898 and completed during June, 1899. The ship was acquired for World War I naval service and, as USS Quinnebaug, participated in planting the North Sea Mine Barrage. In March 1919 the ship returned to service as Jefferson with the Old Dominion Line.

== Commercial service 1898–1917 ==
Schedules show Jefferson and sister ship Hamilton on Old Dominion Line's "Main Line Division" that provided ocean service between New York and the connecting steamship and rail lines of Chesapeake Bay.

The United States Shipping Board took control of the ship from Old Dominion Steamship Company in 1917.

== Naval service ==
The ship was chartered by United States Navy 3 December 1917, fitted out for service at Robins Dry Dock and Repair Company at Brooklyn, New York. The minelaying conversion enabled her to carry mines on two decks, and included four Otis elevators individually capable of transferring two mines every 20 seconds from the storage deck to the launching deck. The ship was commissioned as USS Quinnebaug on 28 March 1918 at Brooklyn.

Assigned to the United States North Sea Mine Force the ship was ordered 13 May 1918 to Invergordon, Scotland for North Sea operations as part of Mine Squadron 1 from 14 July through 26 October 1918. Under escort of British destroyers she completed ten mining missions, planting approximately 6,040 mines in the North Sea Mine Barrage. A breakdown of missions shows:

- planted 600 mines during the 3rd minelaying excursion on 14 July,
- planted 600 mines during the 4th minelaying excursion on 29 July,
- planted 610 mines during the 6th minelaying excursion on 18 August,
- planted 590 mines during the 7th minelaying excursion on 26 August,
- planted 600 mines during the 8th minelaying excursion on 7 September,
- planted 600 mines during the 9th minelaying excursion on 20 September,
- planted 610 mines during the 10th minelaying excursion on 27 September,
- planted 610 mines during the 11th minelaying excursion on 4 October,
- planted 615 mines during the 12th minelaying excursion on 13 October, and
- planted 610 mines during the final 13th minelaying excursion on 24 October.

In the words of British Rear Admiral Lewis Clinton-Baker, the North Sea mine barrage was the "biggest mine planting stunt in the world's history." The United States converted eight civilian steamships as minelayers for the 100,000 mines manufactured for the barrage.

Quinnebaug then returned to the United States for decommissioning at Philadelphia on 6 February 1919 and was returned to the Old Dominion Steamship Company on 19 March 1919.

== Return to commercial service 1919 ==
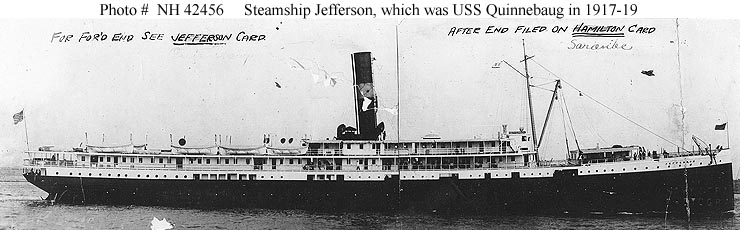
SS Jefferson, 1899. Her sister ship, SS Hamilton, had an almost identical career as USS Saranac (ID-1702).

The ship resumed commercial service with the Old Dominion Line along with her sister ship Hamilton, which had also been converted into the mine ship USS Saranac. In 1920 the Old Dominion Transportation Company took over both Jefferson and Hamilton from the Old Dominion Steamship Company for $850,000. The ships and Norfolk terminals obtained from Old Dominion Steamship Company were to support the purchaser's rail links to the north on Virginia's Eastern Shore.

Broken up in Baltimore in 1933.
