= SS Monroe (1902) =

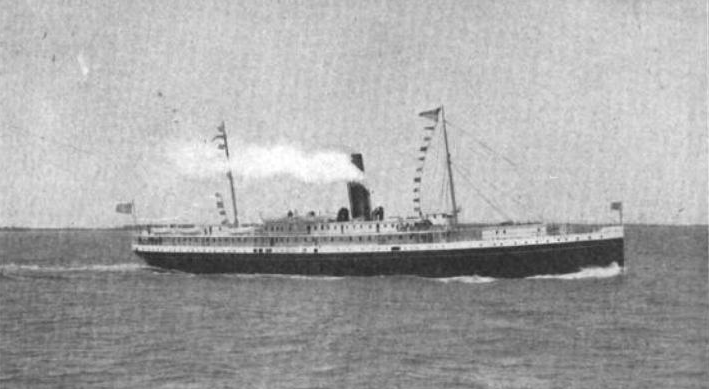
- SS Monroe photographed 1903.

History

United States
- Name: SS Monroe
- Owner: Old Dominion Steamship Company
- Operator: Old Dominion Line
- Builder: Newport News Shipbuilding
- Launched: 18 October 1902
- Completed: 3 April 1903
- Maiden voyage: 6 April 1903
- Out of service: 30 January 1914
- Identification: United States Official Number 93355
- Fate: Sank following collision 1914

General characteristics
- Type: Steamship
- Tonnage: 4,704 gross (Note: The 1910 reference heads the column "Gross tonnage" but this is not today's Gross Tonnage standardized in the 1960s. It is likely, though not specified, that authority's measure of Gross Register Tonnage.); 2,806 net
- Displacement: 5,375 tons at draft of 18 feet (5.5 m)
- Length: 366 feet (111.6 m) LOA; 344 feet (104.9 m); 345.9 feet (105.4 m)
- Beam: 40.2 feet (12.3 m)
- Depth: 18 feet (5.5 m)
- Speed: 16 knots (30 km/h)
- Crew: 84

SS Monroe was an Old Dominion Steamship Company steamship launched 18 October 1902 and completed 3 April 1903 by Newport News Shipbuilding of Norfolk, Virginia for operation in the company's Old Dominion Line's "Main Line Division" for overnight service between New York and Norfolk and could make 16 knots (30 km/h). The ship had accommodations for 150 first class, 78 steerage and 53 deck passengers. That service was between New York pier 26, North River, and Norfolk connecting with the line's "Virginia Division" steamers, including Old Dominion's "Night Line Steamers" Berkley and Brandon serving Richmond with overnight service to Norfolk, other steamer lines and rail lines serving the Chesapeake Bay area. The Monroe was struck at about 2 a.m. on 30 January 1914 by the southbound steamer Nantucket and sank with loss of forty-one lives.

== Design and engineering ==
=== Structure ===
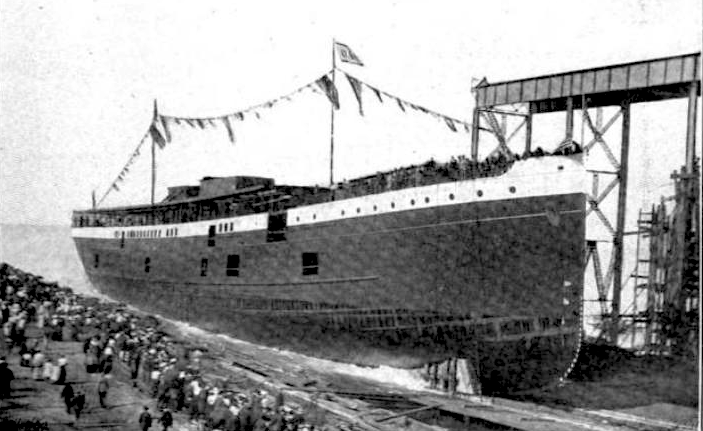
SS Monroe launch 1902.

Monroe, when delivered the largest of the line's ships, was a hurricane deck type steel screw steamer rigged as a two masted schooner with steel construction to the hurricane deck and wood superstructure and deck houses and built to the American Bureau of Shipping standards for coastwise vessels. Key specifications were 366 feet (111.6 m) length overall, 344 feet (104.9 m) length between perpendiculars, 46 feet (14.0 m) molded beam, 37 feet (11.3 m) depth to hurricane deck at lowest point of sheer, 5,375 ton displacement at draft of 18 feet (5.5 m), four steel bladed propeller of 17 feet (5.2 m) diameter. The United States registration gives tonnage as 4,704 gross and 2,806 net. The hull was single bottom with three complete decks. From uppermost, all decks were shade deck, hurricane deck, main deck, lower deck and orlop deck. Frames, continuous from keel to hurricane deck were at 26 inches (66.0 cm) spacing from stem to the over-all hatch and then alternate from keel to main deck or the hurricane deck with double frames at five water tight bulkheads dividing the ship into four water tight compartments. Heavier plating covered the frames forward of the collision bulkhead. Steel decks were covered by yellow pine, 3.75 inches (9.5 cm) thick on the main deck, with the hurricane deck was pine aft to passenger accommodations and from there aft in canvased white pine.

=== Engineering ===
Propulsion was by an inverted cylinder, triple expansion engine with cylinders of 33 inches (83.8 cm), 52 inches (132.1 cm) and 84 inches (213.4 cm) with 54 inches (137.2 cm) stroke. Steam was provided by six Scotch boilers arranged with axis athwartship each fired by three Morison furnaces. The furnaces were coal fired with the coal capacity being 247.5 gross tons based on 45 cubic feet/ton. Three 25 kW General Electric generators provided 125 volt power for lighting.

=== Passenger accommodations ===
The intended transit time for each run was eighteen to nineteen hours with one night aboard. Sixty-one staterooms on the hurricane deck and main deck aft of machinery spaces were for first class white passengers and eleven staterooms on the shade deck were reserved for twenty-one first class colored passengers. Other accommodations were provided for seventy-eight steerage passengers and fifty-four "second class" passengers indicated as "deck passengers" and eighty-two crew. All staterooms and deck housing were white painted pine with salons and passenger spaces aft excepting staterooms paneled in mahogany. Staterooms had two berths, the upper folding away when not in use and hair stuffed transom seats, lavatories, toilet and ventilation.

The main salon was entered through sliding doors on the main deck with stairs leading to a social hall on the hurricane deck with a large oil painting of President Monroe above the builder's plate located on the landing all topped by a well with a skylight patterned with green wreaths and mauve ribbons on an opalescent background. A special stateroom, with a full sized brass bed and private bath with a white porcelain tub was off the base of the stairway opposite the purser's office. These areas, as were the staterooms, were carpeted with Royal Wilton carpets matching the green general decor of furnishings.

Two bathrooms were provided for general use and had tubs and showers with tiled floors and walls. A stairway from the social hall led to an observation room on the shade deck which had seating and a piano and exits aft to a promenade. The first class dining room, at the forward end of the hurricane deck housing and finished in white and gold, could seat 114 people. The colored passengers were provided a smoking room and toilets on the starboard side aft of the quarters on the shade deck to which they were segregated and was railed off from the other areas of that deck. Steerage passengers had quarters for forty-two men and thirty-six women on the main deck aft with a wash room and toilet for each. Deck passengers were housed aft of steerage quarters in a space with berths, but one that could also be used for cargo and the main deck aft had hammock hooks for use of seamen on passage between Norfolk and New York Navy Yards.

=== Freight ===
Two cargo holds and spaces, with a total of about 217,000 cubic feet, could be accessed by hatches on deck or by cargo ports on the vessel's side.

=== Safety ===
Capacity for 365 persons was provided in nine 24 feet (7.3 m) metallic lifeboats on hinged davits and four Carley liferafts. Carley liferafts had been condemned on coastwise ships on 31 December 1913 but shipowners had been granted a 90-day extension. (Note: In the actual sinking all but three of the lifeboats were incapacitated by either the rapid list or the collision itself.)

== Service ==
Monroe, official number 93355, departed Virginia 6 April 1903 and arrived New York the next day on her maiden voyage. By July 1903 Old Dominion Line was advertising Monroe along with the slightly older steamship Jefferson for special Fourth of July overnight cruises from New York to Old Point Comfort, Virginia. Monroe, Jefferson, Hamilton, Princess Anne and Jamestown for the overnight shuttle service in which one of the five ships sailed daily from both New York and Norfolk.

== Sinking ==
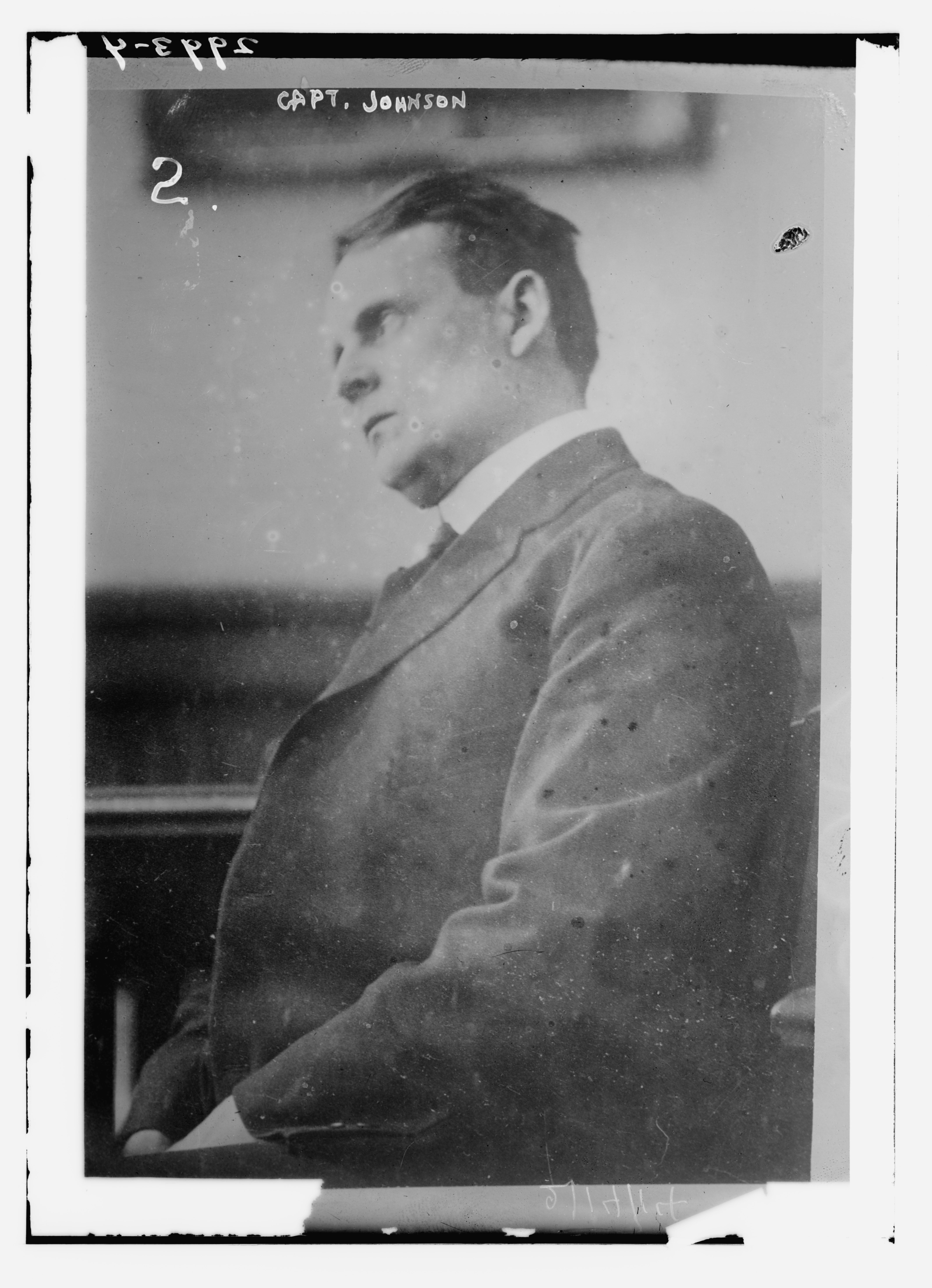
Captain Johnson

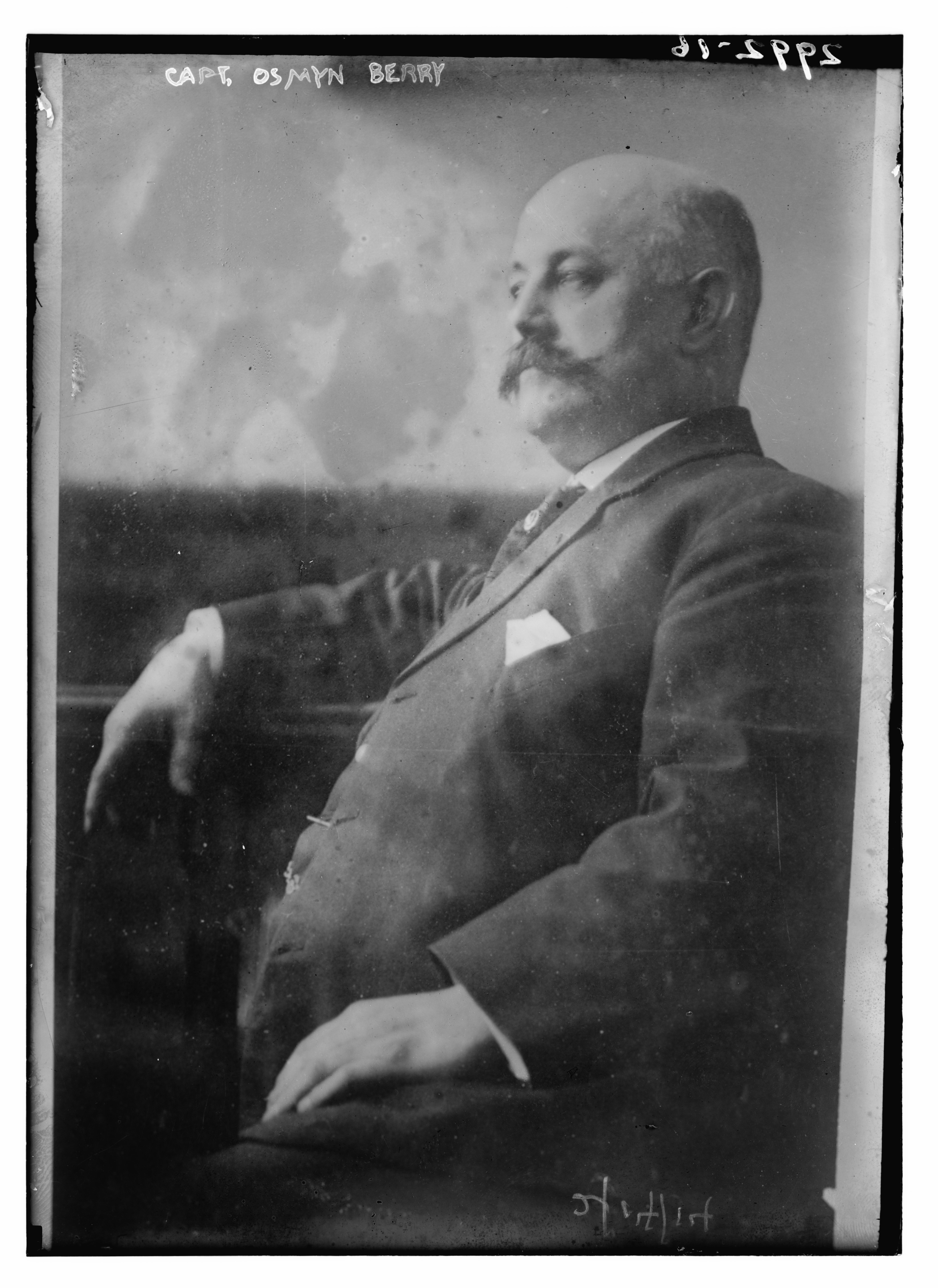
Captain Berry

The northbound Monroe captained by Edward E. Johnson had left Norfolk at 7 p.m. and at about 2 a.m. in fog on 30 January 1914 was struck by the southbound from Boston Merchants and Miners Steamship Company vessel, SS Nantucket (Note: Built 1899 Bethlehem Steel Wilmington, Wilmington, Delaware, United States Official Number 130815, 2,599 gt., 274.0 feet (83.5 m) length, 40.0 feet (12.2 m) beam.) captained by Osmyn Berry, about 50 miles (80 km) off the Virginia Capes (37°37′N 75°14′W). Monroe rolled over and sank in ten to twelve minutes after being struck with her quick list making it impossible to launch the four lifeboats on the port side and of those on the starboard side number 1 boat was crushed in the collision, number 3 fell into the water and was swamped with only number 5 and number 7 boats able to get away cleanly. Many were trapped below with an account of six trapped in a stateroom when attempted rescue failed. A number of people were saved in the partially submerged lifeboat while none were saved by the undamaged Carley rafts.

Among the lost was Monroe's wireless operator, F. J. Kuehn of the Bronx, who stuck by his equipment and was seen giving his life jacket to a woman passenger. (Note: Robert Lee Etheridge was radio operator aboard Nantucket.) Monroe and cargo were lost along with 41 of her crew and passengers. The breakdown of those lost was 32 men, 8 women and 1 child, 19 were passengers and 22 were crew.

Many were caught in the final roll with people crawling onto the undamaged side of Monroe just before she sank. Many were picked up by boats from Nantucket, but the surviving quartermaster of Monroe testified to the effect those boats had been slow to launch and were not competently crewed.

Later Wreck reduced to a clearance of 9 fathoms by USRC Onondaga.

=== Consequences ===
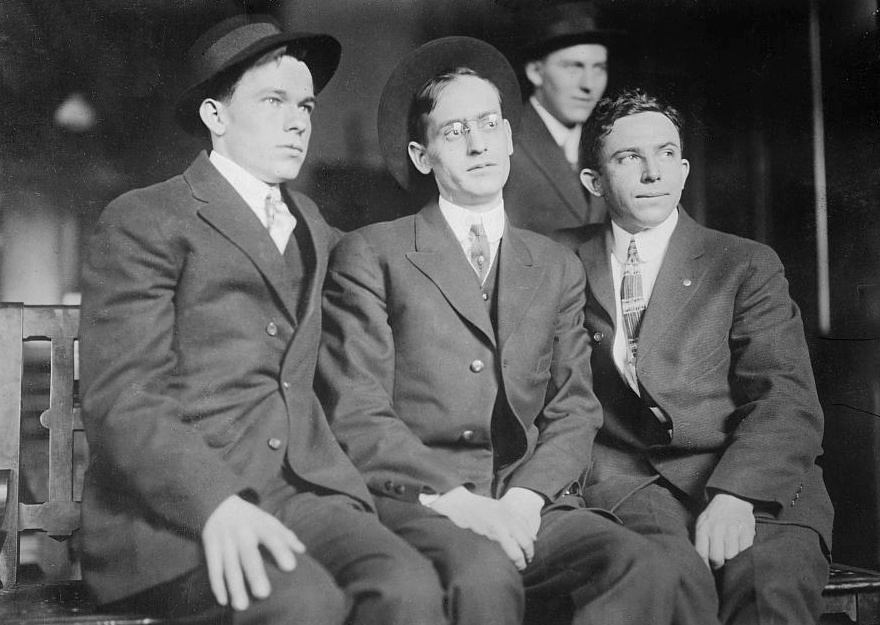
Crew of SS Monroe during the 1914 inquiry

On an appeal from the initial inquiry, during which a board of the Steamboat Inspection Service at Philadelphia had found both captains jointly at fault, Berry was found solely guilty and his license was revoked. In the face of lawsuits of $1,000,000 from Old Dominion and others from survivors Merchants and Miners successfully sought to limit liability to the value of the Nantucket itself. Nantucket was sold at a marshal's sale and bought by the president of Merchants and Miners Steamship Company for $85,000, the sum available to settle claims.

== Bibliography ==
- Allen, W.F. (1908). "Old Dominion Line". Official Guide of the Railways and Steam Navigation Lines of the United States, Porto Rico, Canada, Mexico and Cuba. 40 (8). National Railway Publication Company.
- "Advertisements: 4th of July—Old Dominion Line". Brooklyn Daily Eagle (1 July 1903).
- "The New Steamship Monroe of the Old Dominion Line". Cambridge Chronicle. 18 April 1903.
- "The Steamboat Inspection Service". The Coast Seamen's Journal. XXVII (37). International Seamen's Union. 27 May 1914.
- Colton, T. (2 May 2014). "Newport News Shipbuilding, Newport News VA". Shipbuilding History. T. Colton. Archived from the original on 26 October 2014.
- Forty-Second Annual List of Merchant Vessels of the United States. Washington, D.C.: Department of Commerce and Labor—Bureau of Navigation. 1910.
- "Steamship Monroe of the Old Dominion Line". Marine Engineering. VIII (8). Marine Engineering, Inc. August 1903.
- "New Steamer Monroe Arrives". New York Daily Tribune. 7 April 1903.
- "Stricken Ship Turns Turtle After Receiving Blow Amidships" (PDF). The New York Times. 31 January 1914.
- "Blamed For Monroe Wreck" (PDF). The New York Times. 22 April 1914.
- "To Limit Wreck Liability" (PDF). The New York Times. 11 February 1914.
