= Charles H. Kennerly =

American naval officer and engineer (1885–1973)

Charles H. Kennerly (b. 1885 – April 8, 1973) was an American naval officer, engineer, and wartime public official.

During World War I, Kennerly served as a lieutenant commander in the U.S. Navy, where he was assigned to the United States Shipping Board as a port engineer. Between the first and second World Wars, Kennerly served as the superintending port engineer for the Old Dominion Steamship Company for several years. During World War II, Kennerly was appointed as managing director of the War Shipping Administration. In the role, he supervised maintenance, repair, and operations of all Allied merchant shipping from the U.S. East Coast to the Gulf of Mexico, including wartime supervision for the entire New York Harbor. In 1942, Kennerly spoke against the deportation order of 42 War Production Board employees who were non-U.S. citizens, stating that it was necessary and essential that they be allowed to remain in their posts to support the war effort.

Kennerly died on April 8, 1973, at the age of 88. His obituary was printed in the New York Times.
