= City of Waco =

American steamship

Coordinates: 29.3363°N 94.7148°W

History

United States
- Name: City of Waco
- Operator: Mallory Line, New York
- Route: New York-Galveston
- Builder: Delaware River Iron Ship Building and Engine Works, Chester, Pennsylvania
- Completed: 1873
- In service: August 1873
- Fate: Burned and sank, November 9, 1875

General characteristics
- Type: Passenger/cargo steamship
- Tonnage: 1,486 tons
- Length: 242 ft (74 m)
- Beam: 36 ft (11 m)
- Propulsion: Steam engine, single screw

City of Waco was an American steamship which sank with much loss of life on November 9, 1875, in the Gulf of Mexico off Galveston, Texas.

== Ship history ==
The ship was built in 1873 by John Roach & Sons at their Delaware River Iron Ship Building and Engine Works in Chester, Pennsylvania for the Mallory Line of New York City. She made twenty voyages between New York and Galveston before she sank.

On the afternoon of November 8, 1875, the ship arrived off Galveston, but heavy weather made it impossible to enter the port, so the ship hove to offshore and waited for the storm to subside. Shortly before midnight a fire broke out aboard, rapidly engulfing the ship, which burned down to the waterline before sinking with the loss of all 56 crew and passengers.

An investigation into the tragedy discovered that the ship had nine hundred 5 US gal (19 L) cans of Astral lamp oil stored on deck, in direct contravention of maritime regulations which forbade the transport of such a dangerous cargo on a passenger ship.

The wreck was broken up with explosives in 1900 to clear the entrance to the port and then largely forgotten. It was rediscovered in 2003, and explored by marine archeologists of the Texas Historical Commission.
