= USS Saranac (1899) =

U.S. Navy minelayer in WWI

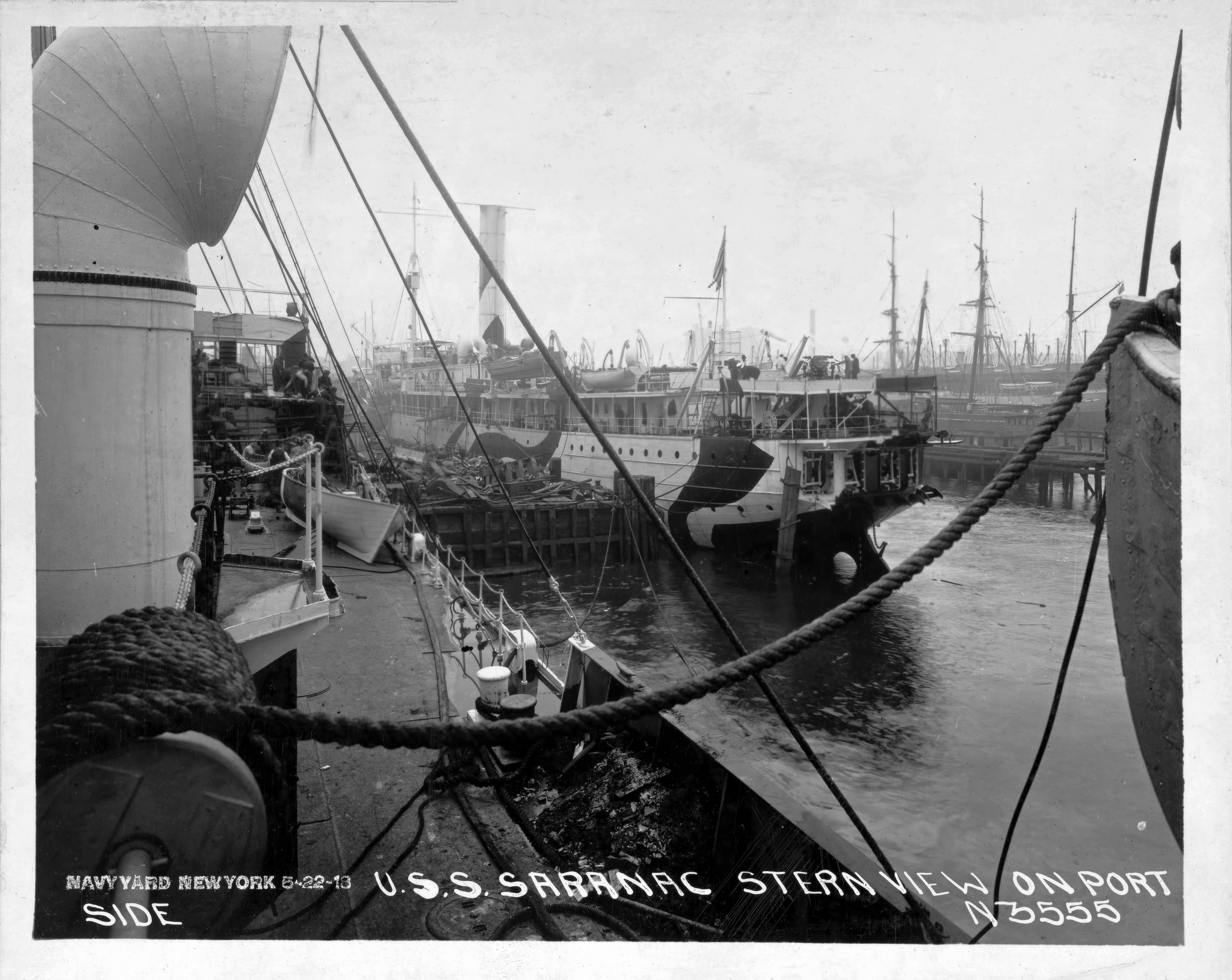

History

United States
- Name: USS Saranac
- Builder: John Roach & Sons, Delaware River Iron Ship Building and Engine Works, Chester, Pennsylvania
- Launched: 1899
- Commissioned: 9 April 1918
- Notes: Operated as commercial passenger-cargo ship Hamilton c. 1899-1917

General characteristics
- Type: Minelayer (in 1918)
- Displacement: 5,150 tons
- Length: 375 ft (114 m)
- Beam: 42 ft (13 m)
- Draft: 18.5 ft (5.6 m)
- Speed: 16 knots
- Capacity: 612 mines (642 max)
- Crew: 18 officers and 392 men
- Armament: 1 × 5"/51 caliber gun; 2 × 3"/23 caliber guns

The third USS Saranac was the Old Dominion Steamship Company Hamilton temporarily converted for planting the World War I North Sea Mine Barrage. John Roach & Sons launched Hamilton at Chester, Pennsylvania in 1899. Hamilton steamed between Norfolk, Virginia and New York City until The United States Shipping Board took control of the ship from Old Dominion Steamship Company in 1917. She was fitted out for United States Navy service by James Shewan & Sons at Brooklyn, New York. The minelaying conversion enabled her to carry mines on two decks, and included four Otis elevators individually capable of transferring two mines every 20 seconds from the storage deck to the launching deck. USS Saranac was commissioned on 9 April 1918. While operating as part of Mine Squadron 1 out of Inverness, Scotland, from 14 July until the close of the war on 11 November 1918, Saranac laid a total of 4,782 mines:

- planted 597 mines during the 3rd minelaying excursion on 14 July,
- planted 580 mines during the 4th minelaying excursion on 29 July,
- planted 560 mines during the 8th minelaying excursion on 7 September,
- planted 600 mines during the 9th minelaying excursion on 20 September,
- planted 610 mines during the 10th minelaying excursion on 27 September,
- planted 610 mines during the 11th minelaying excursion on 4 October,
- planted 615 mines during the 12th minelaying excursion on 13 October, and
- planted 610 mines during the final 13th minelaying excursion on 24 October.

Saranac then returned to the United States for decommissioning and return to Old Dominion Steamship Company in 1919.

== Sister ship ==
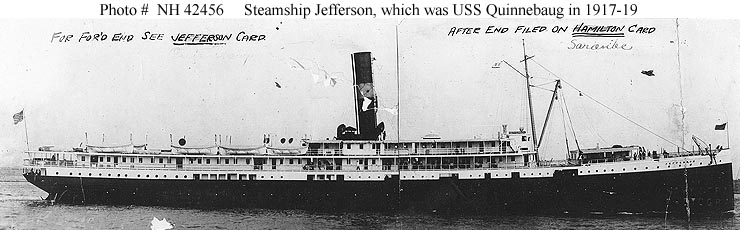
Jefferson—sister ship of Hamilton. Photograph was featured on the World War I USN data cards for both ships.

In the words of British Rear Admiral Lewis Clinton-Baker, the North Sea mine barrage was the "biggest mine planting stunt in the world's history." The United States converted eight civilian steamships as minelayers for the 100,000 mines manufactured for the barrage. Old Dominion Steamship Jefferson was similarly converted to USS Quinnebaug among these eight.
