= Old Dominion Steamship Company =

Major Passengers and Shipping Company

- Old Dominion Steamship Company ship list from the 1880s
- Industry: Shipping, Passenger
- Founded: 1867 in Norfolk, Virginia, United States
- Founder: Isaac Bell
- Defunct: 1920s
- Fate: Sold to Eastern Steamship Lines
- Area served: East Coast of the United States

Old Dominion Steamship Company, also referred to as the Old Dominion Line, was a major cargo and passenger shipping company founded in 1867 in Norfolk, Virginia.

== History ==
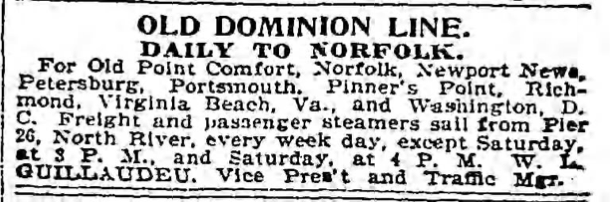
New York to Chesapeake Bay Ports advertisement, The Brooklyn Daily Eagle, 1898

Established in 1867, the founder and first President of the Old Dominion Steamship Company was Isaac Bell (1814–1897), and its first Vice President was George W. Elder. Former Attorney General of Delaware Jacob Moore served for a period as the company's legal counsel. Subsequent presidents of the company included H.B. Walker and W.L. Woodrow.

The company's "Main Line Division" offered an overnight transportation service between New York and Norfolk could make 16 knots (30 km/h). That service was between New York pier 26, North River, and Norfolk connecting with the line's "Virginia Division" steamers, including Old Dominion's "Night Line Steamers" Berkley and Brandon serving Richmond with overnight service to Norfolk.

In the 1880s, the longshoremen employed by the company began a widely publicized strike, seeking an increase in wages and overtime pay. Charles H. Kennerly served as the port engineer for the company for several years. In the early 1920s, the Old Dominion Steamship Company became a subsidiary of Eastern Steamship Lines.

== Ships ==
Ships owned by the Old Dominion Steamship Company included:

- SS Berkeley
- SS Brandon
- SS Breakwater
- SS George Washington
- SS George W. Elder
- Tugboat Germania
- SS Guyandotte
- SS Hamilton, later the USS Saranac (1899) during World War I
- SS Isaac Bell
- SS Jamestown
- SS Jefferson, later the USS Quinnebaug (SP-1687) during World War I
- SS Madison
- SS Manhattan
- SS Manteo
- SS Mobjack
- SS Monroe
- SS Ocracoke
- SS Old Dominion
- SS Pocahontas
- SS Princes Anne
- SS Richmond
- SS Roanoke
- SS Robert E. Lee
- SS R L Meyers
- SS Yorktown, later the USS Resolute during the Spanish–American War

== In popular culture ==
An 1876 painting by Antonio Jacobsen titled, Old Dominion Line Steamer Isaac Bell off Sandy Hook, is on display at the Barry Art Museum at Old Dominion University.
