= USS Mistletoe (1872) =

Patrol vessel of the United States Navy

History

United States
- Name: USS Mistletoe
- Completed: 1872
- Commissioned: April 1917
- Decommissioned: July 1919

General characteristics
- Displacement: 455 tons
- Length: 153 ft
- Beam: 26 ft
- Draft: 6 ft 9 in
- Speed: 10 knots
- Complement: 20
- Armament: (As lighthouse tender) none

The second USS Mistletoe was a wooden lighthouse tender built in 1872 by Robinson Hoffman and Company in Chester, Pennsylvania.

== Service history ==
The ship was operated by the Lighthouse Service of the Commerce Department. On 11 April 1917, she was transferred to the Navy with the entire Lighthouse Service by executive order.

Assigned to the 3rd Naval District, Mistletoe served during World War I as a patrol boat out of Section Base No. 8, Tompkinsville, Staten Island. Following the end of the war, the vessel was returned to the custody of the Department of Commerce, 1 July 1919.
