= List of shipwrecks in 1907 =

The list of shipwrecks in 1907 includes ships sunk, foundered, grounded, or otherwise lost during 1907.

table of contents
1907
Jan	Feb	Mar	Apr
May	Jun	Jul	Aug
Sep	Oct	Nov	Dec
Unknown date

== January ==
=== 1 January ===
List of shipwrecks: 1 January 1907
Ship	State	Description
Lelia E. Rowley	United States	The 10-gross register ton sloop was stranded at Brunswick, Georgia. Both people on board survived.

=== 4 January ===
List of shipwrecks: 4 January 1907
Ship	State	Description
Alice T. Boardman	United States	The 123-gross register ton schooner was stranded on Handkerchief Shoal off the coast of Massachusetts with the loss of one life. Refloated on 6 January and taken to Hyannis, Massachusetts, intact by USRC Gresham and a tug, or was blown in two with one part left in place and the other part taken to Hyannis Port, Massachusetts. There were four survivors who were rescued by the United States Life Saving Service.
Greyhound	United States	While pulled out on the beach at Nome, District of Alaska, for the winter with no one aboard, the 9-ton or 11-gross register ton (sources disagree), 52-foot (15.8 m) motor vessel was crushed by ice on the sand spit between the Snake River and the Bering Sea. She was declared a total loss.

=== 7 January ===
List of shipwrecks: 7 January 1907
Ship	State	Description
Nellie	United States	The 41-gross register ton screw steamer burned at College Wharf on the Delaware River. All four people on board survived.
Nymph	United States	The 10-gross register ton, 30.6-foot (9.3 m) sloop was wrecked at Hadley (57°09′N 134°17′W), District of Alaska, in Lyman Anchorage on the Kenai Peninsula. The only person aboard survived.

=== 8 January ===
List of shipwrecks: 8 January 1907
Ship	State	Description
Point Firmin	United States	The 6-gross register ton motor vessel was stranded at Santa Barbara, California. Both people on board survived.

=== 9 January ===
List of shipwrecks: 9 January 1907
Ship	State	Description
Blanche Morgan	United States	The 44-gross register ton schooner sank in the East River off Brooklyn, New York, just east of the Brooklyn Bridge after colliding with the barge Lancaster (United States), which was among barges under tow by the steam tug Covington (United States). Her entire crew of eight survived and made it onto one of the barges.
Favorite	United States	The 409-gross register ton screw steamer burned at St. Ignace, Michigan. Both people on board survived.
Nellie	United States	The tow steamer burned to the waterline in the Delaware River off College Point.

=== 10 January ===
List of shipwrecks: 10 January 1907
Ship	State	Description
Delaware	United States	The 294-gross register ton barge was stranded either on Napatree Point, 1 mile (1.6 km) west-northwest of the United States Life-Saving Service station at Watch Hill, Rhode Island, or on Fishers Island in New York (sources disagree) when she lost her towline to Coastwise (United States) in a gale in Long Island Sound. Her crew made it to shore in her boats.
Favorite	United States	The laid-up steamer burned at St. Ignace, Michigan and was totally destroyed.
Honesdale	United States	The 277-gross register ton barge was stranded when she lost her towline to Coastwise (United States) in a gale in Long Island Sound either on Napatree Point 1 nautical mile (1.9 km; 1.2 mi) west-northwest of the United States Life-Saving Service station at Watch Hill, Rhode Island, or on Fishers Island in New York (sources disagree). Both people on board were rescued by the U.S. Life-Saving Service.
Jessie L. Boyce	United States	The 196-gross register ton schooner was stranded on Stimpsons Island on the coast of Maine. All six people on board survived.
Marvin	United States	The barge was stranded on Napatree Point, 1 mile (1.6 km) west-northwest of the Watch Hill, Rhode Island, Life-Saving Station, or on Fishers Island in New York (sources disagree) when she lost her towline after losing her towline to Coastwise (United States) in a gale in Long Island Sound. Both people on board were rescued by the United States Life-Saving Service.
Richard Wainwright	United States	The 133-gross register ton schooner was stranded in St. George's Bay on the coast of Newfoundland with the loss of one life. There were nine survivors.
Tropic Bird	United States	The 347-gross register ton barkentine was stranded in Chamela Bay on the coast of Mexico. All 10 people on board survived.

=== 11 January ===
List of shipwrecks: 11 January 1907
Ship	State	Description
Alice Gertrude	United States	The wooden screw steamer was wrecked on Ship Point Reef or Slip Point Reef (sources disagree) while attempting to enter either Clallam Bay, Washington, or a port in Oregon (sources disagree) during a severe snowstorm. All 31 passengers and crew were rescued by the tugs Lorne and Wyadda and the passenger steamer Rosalie (all United States).
Dash	United States	The 17-gross register ton schooner was stranded on Woman Key in the Florida Keys. All three people on board survived.
Welcome	United States	With no one on board, the 30-gross register ton sternwheel passenger paddle steamer broke her moorings on the Coquille River in Oregon during high water, drifted into trees, and was wrecked at Myrtle Point.

=== 12 January ===
List of shipwrecks: 12 January 1907
Ship	State	Description
Ella Rohlffs	United States	The steamer ran aground on a reef off Fish-Egg Island. She was refloated on 14 January.
Felicidad	United States	The 6-gross register ton sloop foundered off Isla de Ramos, Puerto Rico, with the loss of one life. There were two survivors.
Joe Hooker	United States	The motor vessel was destroyed by a gas explosion at Vincennes, Indiana.
King Edward VII	United Kingdom	The fishing trawler was wrecked on Cape Utskalar, Ireland.

=== 13 January ===
List of shipwrecks: 13 January 1907
Ship	State	Description
Onondaga	United States	The 2,696 GRT steamer on a voyage from Boston to Charleston and Jacksonville with general cargo ran aground on Orleans Beach, near Orleans and got stranded. The ship was successfully refloated on 14 March, repaired and returned to service in April of the same year.

=== 14 January ===
List of shipwrecks: 14 January 1907
Ship	State	Description
John I. Snow	United States	The 196-gross register ton schooner was stranded, filled, and sank at Portsmouth Beach, Virginia. She was stripped and abandoned. All seven people on board were rescued by the United States Life-Saving Service.
Sea Flower	United States	The 7-gross register ton sloop-rigged yacht was stranded in Green Bay on the coast of Wisconsin. All four people on board survived.
Sequoia	United States	The steam screw cargo ship parted one of her wheel ropes while crossing the bar at Humboldt Bay on the North Coast of California. She lost steering and struck rocks off the North Jetty. She was backed off, but leaking water put out her boiler fire, causing her to lose propulsion. The United States Life Saving Service rescued her crew. She was stranded on the beach in Humboldt Bay. She was stripped and abandoned.

=== 15 January ===
List of shipwrecks: 15 January 1907
Ship	State	Description
Red Wing	United States	The tow steamer struck a snag in the Nassau River, Florida and sank. Raised immediately.

=== 17 January ===
List of shipwrecks: 17 January 1907
Ship	State	Description
Prinz Waldemar	Germany	The 4,658 GRT ocean liner ran aground on a reef east of Plum Point Lighthouse while trying to enter Kingston Harbour. The lighthouse was not working due to a recent earthquake, contributing to the disaster.

=== 18 January ===
List of shipwrecks: 18 January 1907
Ship	State	Description
Patricia	Greece	The vessel collided with Moringen (Norway) off the Haisboro' Light, England and sank.

=== 19 January ===
List of shipwrecks: 19 January 1907
Ship	State	Description
Marie	United States	The steamer sank in a strong windstorm while tied to the bank at Evansville, Indiana. Later raised.
Marie Thérese	France	The brigantine was wrecked on the Helwick Sands, in the Bristol Channel. Her eight crew survived. She was on a voyage from Arcachon, Loire-Inférieure to Swansea, Glamorgan, United Kingdom.
Maud Malloch	United States	The 116-gross register ton schooner was stranded at Otter Point on the coast of Maine. All three people on board survived.
Naworth Castle	United Kingdom	The steamer collided with the ocean liner Vaderland (Belgium) in the English Channel off the Goodwin Sands and sank.

=== 20 January ===
List of shipwrecks: 20 January 1907
Ship	State	Description
A. C. Brower	United States	The laid up steamer was washed ashore at Buffalo, New York, when part of the harbor's breakwater was destroyed in a gale and snowstorm.
Annie M. Ash	United States	The 1,258-gross register ton schooner barge or scow barge foundered off Fire Island on the coast of Long Island, New York. All five people on board survived.
Hurlbut W. Smith	United States	The laid up steamer was washed ashore at Buffalo, New York, when part of the harbor's breakwater was destroyed in a gale and snowstorm. The vessel was refloated on 15 July.
J. Q. Riddle	United States	The laid up steamer was washed ashore at Buffalo, New York, when part of the harbor's breakwater was destroyed in a gale and snowstorm.
Monroe C. Smith	United States	The laid up steamer was washed ashore at Buffalo, New York, when part of the harbor's breakwater was destroyed in a gale and snowstorm.
Vigilant	United States	The 92-gross register ton motor vessel was stranded on Pearl Island, Newfoundland. All 10 people on board survived.
William Nottingham	United States	The laid up steamer was washed ashore at Buffalo, New York, when part of the harbor's breakwater was destroyed in a gale and snowstorm. The vessel was refloated on 28 June.

=== 21 January ===
List of shipwrecks: 21 January 1907
Ship	State	Description
Dictator	United States	The tug was damaged in a collision with ferry Goshen (United States) in the North River off Twentieth Street, New York City. She headed for dock at Thirteenth Street, Hoboken, New Jersey, but sank in shoal water off Hoboken.
Montana	United States	Carrying a cargo of coal and lumber, the 165-foot (50 m), 852-gross register ton schooner barge (or scow barge) foundered in a gale with heavy seas 300 feet (91 m) off the entrance buoy for Great Salt Pond Harbor on Block Island off the coast of Rhode Island, sinking in up to 80 feet (24 m) of water 0.5 nautical miles (0.93 km; 0.58 mi) west-northwest of the Great Salt Pond jetty at 41°12′07″N 071°36′03″W. All four people on board were rescued by a tug. The wreck was dynamited and partly removed between 1 and 16 May.

=== 22 January ===
List of shipwrecks: 22 January 1907
Ship	State	Description
Cohasset	United States	The 965-gross register ton schooner burned at Canton, Maryland. All five people on board survived.
Fiheman	United States	The 174-gross register ton schooner foundered off Cape Elizabeth, Maine. All five people on board survived.
Marie	United States	The steamer sank at Evansville, Indiana.

=== 23 January ===
List of shipwrecks: 23 January 1907
Ship	State	Description
Success	United States	With no one on board, the 13-gross register ton screw steamer foundered in Lake Washington in Washington.

=== 24 January ===
List of shipwrecks: 24 January 1907
Ship	State	Description
Adam W. Spies	United States	The 1,222-gross register ton schooner was stranded 40 nautical miles (74 km; 46 mi) west of Stirrup Key in the Florida Keys. All 10 people on board survived.
Addie	United States	The 80-gross register ton schooner was stranded on Turtle Island Ledge off the coast of Maine. All three people on board survived.

=== 25 January ===
List of shipwrecks: 25 January 1907
Ship	State	Description
Clemente	United States	The 7-gross register ton motor vessel was lost when she collided with the screw steamer Carmel (United States) in the harbor at San Pedro, California. Both people on board survived.
J. C. Elliott	United States	The 29-gross register ton motor vessel was lost when she collided with the screw steamer Carmel (United States) in the harbor at San Pedro, California. All four people on board survived.
Richard III	United States	The 985-gross register ton barge was cast adrift and abandoned during a gale by her towing vessel, the steamer Alaskan (United States), in Clarence Strait in the Alexander Archipelago in Southeast Alaska due to the bad weather and low fuel. All six people aboard survived. She eventually was wrecked without loss of life in Virago Sound on Graham Island in the Queen Charlotte Islands in British Columbia, Canada.
Samuel H. Sharp	United States	The 236-gross register ton schooner was stranded on Cape May on the coast of New Jersey and broke up. The United States Life-Saving Service rescued all six people on board.

=== 27 January ===
List of shipwrecks: 27 January 1907
Ship	State	Description
India Givens	United States	The 28-gross register ton sternwheel paddle steamer burned whiling lying at the bank of the Mississippi River at Hickman, Kentucky. All 20 people on board survived, but she was declared a total loss.

=== 28 January ===
List of shipwrecks: 28 January 1907
Ship	State	Description
J. M. Bowell	United States	The steamer was at her landing in the upper Green River and sprung a leak and sank.

=== 29 January ===
List of shipwrecks: 29 January 1907
Ship	State	Description
J. N. Pharr	United States	The 16-gross register ton sternwheel paddle steamer burned to the waterline and sank in six feet (1.8 m) of water in Lake Des Allemands, Louisiana. All six people on board survived,

=== 31 January ===
List of shipwrecks: 31 January 1907
Ship	State	Description
Andrew Adams	United States	The 812-gross register ton schooner was stranded on Isla Barú near Cartagena, Colombia. All eight people on board survived.
G. T. Melton	United States	The 347-gross register ton sternwheel paddle steamer was stranded at Lumber City, Georgia. All eight people on board survived.

== February ==
=== 2 February ===
List of shipwrecks: 2 February 1907
Ship	State	Description
Charles Loring	United States	The 552-gross register ton bark was lost in a collision with the screw steamer Seneca (United States) off Sandy Hook, New Jersey, 15 nautical miles (28 km; 17 mi) off the Scotland Lightship. Her entire crew of 10 was taken off by Seneca and survived.
Elsie	United States	The tug sank at Union Dock, Baltimore, Maryland. Raised on 4 February.

=== 3 February ===
List of shipwrecks: 3 February 1907
Ship	State	Description
Alpha	United States	The 300-gross register ton schooner was stranded on the coast of Oregon nine miles (14 km) north of the mouth of the Umpqua River. All eight people on board made it to shore on their own. After many failed attempts at refloating her, she was declared an economic total loss and abandoned in June or July 1907.

=== 4 February ===
List of shipwrecks: 4 February 1907
Ship	State	Description
Solano	United States	The 728-gross register ton schooner was stranded on the coast of Washington 4 miles (6.4 km) south of Willapa Bay. All 10 people on board survived.
Tena A. Cotton	United States	The 377-gross register ton schooner was stranded at Ocean City, Maryland. All seven people on board survived.
Zaza	United States	The 17-gross register ton schooner was stranded on San Clemente Island in the Channel Islands off California. All six people on board survived.

=== 5 February ===
List of shipwrecks: 5 February 1907
Ship	State	Description
Bala	United States	The 678-gross register ton schooner barge or scow barge foundered off Atlantic City, New Jersey with the loss of all three people on board.
Darby	United States	The 1,513-gross register ton schooner barge or scow barge foundered off Atlantic City, New Jersey. All five people on board survived.
Ellen F. Gleason	United States	The 72-gross register ton schooner sank when she collided with the screw steamer Winifredian (United Kingdom) in the North Atlantic Ocean 300 nautical miles (560 km; 350 mi) northeast of Boston, Massachusetts. All 14 people on board survived.
Parker	United States	The tow steamer's boiler exploded and she burned to the waterline and sank near Williams Island in the Tennessee River. Two crewmen were killed.
Portland	United Kingdom	The Clyde Shipping Company-owned cargo ship collided with and was run down by Welshman near Greenock, Scotland. She was carrying a cargo of whisky valued at £8,000.
Wm. F. Witzemann	United States	The 473-gross register ton schooner was stranded 4 miles (6.4 km) north of Bolinas, California. All seven people on board survived.
Woodbury	United States	The 735-gross register ton schooner barge or scow barge was stranded off Highland Light on Cape Cod on the coast of Massachusetts in a gale and snowstorm. The United States Life-Saving Service rescued all three people on board. She broke up on 19 February.

=== 6 February ===
List of shipwrecks: 6 February 1907
Ship	State	Description
Bala	United States	The barge, under tow by the steamer Waltham (United States), sprung a leak before midnight on 5 February, and then sank on 6 February near Absecon, New Jersey, with the loss of all three hands.
Darby	United States	The barge sprung a leak before midnight on 5 February. Her crew was rescued by her tow steamer, Waltham (United States), at 12:15 on 6 February. The barge then sank near Absecon, New Jersey.
Hilda	United States	The 647-gross register ton schooner was stranded on Diamond Shoal off Cape Hatteras, North Carolina, in a heavy gale with the loss of all seven people on board.

=== 7 February ===
List of shipwrecks: 7 February 1907
Ship	State	Description
John K. Kirkman	United States	The 37-gross register ton schooner was lost when she struck a pier at Jamestown Island on the James River in Virginia. All three people on board survived.

=== 8 February ===
List of shipwrecks: 8 February 1907
Ship	State	Description
Richmond	United States	The steamer was stranded on Pine Tree Point three miles (4.8 km) miles west north west of the Benton Point, Rhode Island Life Saving Station. Her crew made it to shore on their own. The vessel was refloated on 5 March.

=== 9 February ===
List of shipwrecks: 9 February 1907
Ship	State	Description
Helen J. Seitz	United States	The 2,547-gross register ton schooner was stranded at Beach Haven, New Jersey. All 12 people on board survived.

=== 10 February ===
List of shipwrecks: 10 February 1907
Ship	State	Description
Joseph B. Williams	United States	The steamer struck a landing at Memphis, Tennessee, and sank.
Sara Louise	United States	The steamer struck a snag and sank in the Neuse River 21 miles (34 km) above Newbern, North Carolina. One deck hand missing.
Unknown	United States	Three unidentified coal boats were destroyed in the sinking of Joseph B. Williams (United States) at Memphis, Tennessee.

=== 11 February ===
List of shipwrecks: 11 February 1907
Ship	State	Description
Harry Knowlton	United States	The 317-gross register ton schooner was damaged in a collision with the sidewheel paddle steamer Larchmont (United States) in Block Island Sound off Watch Hill, Rhode Island. Her crew of seven abandoned ship and survived. She eventually drifted ashore off the United States Life-Saving Service station at Quonochontaug, Rhode Island.
Jean Bart	French Navy	The Alger-class protected cruiser was wrecked at Ras Nouadhibou, French West Africa.
Larchmont	United States	The 252-foot (77 m), 1,605-gross register ton sidewheel paddle steamer sank in a gale in 120 to 140 feet (37 to 43 m) of water in Block Island Sound off Watch Hill, Rhode Island, at 41°16′00″N 071°49′18″W after a collision with the schooner Harry Knowlton (United States). Sources disagree on the death toll among the 150 people on board: Either 123 or 133 – 89 passengers and 44 crew – were lost, either in the sinking, or from exposure in her lifeboats, and one source claims approximately 200 people died. The United States Life-Saving Service rescued 20 survivors.
Sprague	United States	The steamer struck a rock dike in the Mississippi River just below Memphis, Tennessee, and sank.
Sylvester Hale	United States	After losing her rudder and going out of control, the 125-gross register ton schooner was damaged in a collision with barges being towed by the steamer Patience (United States) off New Haven Light on the coast of Connecticut. She was taken in tow by Patience, but sank off Stratford, Connecticut. All four people on board survived.
Unidentified coal boats	United States	Nine unidentified coal boats were destroyed in the sinking of Sprague (United States) just below Memphis, Tennessee.

=== 12 February ===
List of shipwrecks: 12 February 1907
Ship	State	Description
Cascade	United States	The laid up steamer sprung a leak and sank at the foot of Twenty-Second Street, Pittsburgh on the Monongahela River. Raised and repaired.
Sego	United States	The steamer sank at Sanborn Landing in the Crooked River.

=== 13 February ===
List of shipwrecks: 13 February 1907
Ship	State	Description
Pemberton	United States	The 184-foot (56 m), 839-gross register ton schooner barge (or scow barge) burned off Woods Hole, Massachusetts, and sank in 35 feet (11 m) of water 1.25 nautical miles (2.3 km; 1.4 mi) northeast of Nobska Light at 41°30′59″N 070°37′41″W. All three people on board survived. Her wreck was removed with dynamite between 2 and 30 April.

=== 14 February ===
List of shipwrecks: 14 February 1907
Ship	State	Description
Florence Witherbee	United States	The 84-gross register ton tugboat sank after colliding with the tug USS Accomac (United States Navy) off the Palafox Street Wharf at Pensacola, Florida. All five people on board survived, but Florence Witherbee was declared a total loss.
Hiawatha	United States	The tug struck a sunken coal boat 1,000 to 1,200 yards (910 to 1,100 m) off the old Fort Lee, New Jersey, ferry dock and sank.

=== 16 February ===
List of shipwrecks: 16 February 1907
Ship	State	Description
F. Y. Batchelor	United States	The 313-gross register ton sternwheel paddle steamer was crushed by ice on the Missouri River at Running Water, South Dakota. All eight people on board survived.
Portland	United States	The steamer ran aground on a reef off Entrance Island, she pulled herself off the rocks and was beached on Gabriola Island.
Susie B	United States	The 41-gross register ton sternwheel motor paddle vessel was "cut down by ice" on the Missouri River at Running Water, South Dakota. Both people on board survived.

=== 17 February ===
List of shipwrecks: 17 February 1907
Ship	State	Description
Irene	United States	The 33-gross register ton schooner was stranded on Hospital Key in the Dry Tortugas in the Gulf of Mexico. All seven people on board survived.
Marguerite Mirabaud	France	The barque ran aground and was wrecked in fog close to Glenledi on the southeast coast of New Zealand while carrying wine and coal briquettes from La Rochelle, France, to Tahiti. All lives saved.
Madeira	United States	The tow steamer sank in the Delaware River while docked at Pier 40 South in Philadelphia, Pennsylvania, when the rising tide caused the vessel to hang on the dock, tip, and fill with water.
Red River	United States	The 97-gross register ton sternwheel paddle steamer sprang a leak and sank in the Red River of the South while docked at Alexandria, Louisiana. All 23 people on board survived.

=== 18 February ===
List of shipwrecks: 18 February 1907
Ship	State	Description
Alaska	United States	The 855-gross register ton schooner barge or scow barge sank in a gale and snowstorm off the coast of Massachusetts in shallow water one and a quarter nautical miles (2.3 km; 1.4 mi) north of the United States Life-Saving Service station at Highland with the loss of all four people on board. She later broke up.
Girard	United States	The 841-gross register ton schooner barge or scow barge was stranded gale and snowstorm on the coast of Massachusetts 1 mile (1.6 km) north of the United States Life-Saving Service station at Highland with the loss of one life. The U.S. Life-Saving Service rescued her master and one crewman.
H. P. Dilworth	United States	The laid-up steamer sprung a leak and sank in the Monongahela River at Rices Landing, Pennsylvania. She was raised and repaired.
Helen M. Atwood	United States	The 718-gross register ton schooner was stranded on Arenas Bank on the coast of Puerto Rico. All eight people on board survived.
Maggie Hastings	United States	The 31-gross register ton schooner sank in the Chickahominy River in Virginia. Both people on board survived.

=== 19 February ===
List of shipwrecks: 19 February 1907
Ship	State	Description
Oriole	United States	The 19-gross register ton sternwheel motor paddle vessel was "cut down by ice" on the Missouri River at Starcher, South Dakota. All three people on board survived.

=== 20 February ===
List of shipwrecks: 20 February 1907
Ship	State	Description
Darling	United States	The steamer was sunk in a collision with the tow of another steamer and sank near Brunot Island in the Ohio River.
Hugoma	United States	The 2,183-gross register ton iron-hulled screw steamer – a cargo ship – was rammed in the Mississippi River off New Orleans, Louisiana, by the armored cruiser Kléber (French Navy) and subsequently sank in 100 feet (30 m) of water. There were 25 people on board Hugoma; sources disagree as to whether all of them survived or seven crewmen died.

=== 21 February ===
List of shipwrecks: 21 February 1907
Ship	State	Description
Berlin	United Kingdom	The steam ferry ran aground, broke in two, broke apart, and sank on the granite breakwater at the entrance to the New Waterway, Hook of Holland in a gale, with the loss of 85 passengers and 48 crew, many from exposure or washed away by high waves. Eight people were rescued by the tug Hellevoetsilius and three women by the tug Wodan.
Bessie K	United States	The 98-gross register ton motor vessel capsized in the Pacific Ocean off the mouth of the Coquille River on he coast of Oregon. All nine people on board perished.

=== 22 February ===
List of shipwrecks: 22 February 1907
Ship	State	Description
Caroline	United States	The tug struck a sheet of ice in the Seekonk River in Rhode Island and was beached. Her stern sank.
Imperatrix	Austria-Hungary	The steamer ran aground off Cape Elaphonissi, Crete and was wrecked. 38 died in a lifeboat trying to get to shore. 102 survived.
Marion	United States	The 206-gross register ton screw steamer caught fire in Wadmalaw Sound on the coast of South Carolina between New Cut and Hart's Wharf. She was run to Hart's Wharf, where she burned to the waterline. Of the 58 people on board, 24 were killed.

=== 23 February ===
List of shipwrecks: 23 February 1907
Ship	State	Description
Victor	United States	The 100-gross register ton sternwheel paddle steamer was struck by a barge while pulling stranded barges off the bank at Sibley Chute in the Mississippi River at Pendleton, Arkansas, causing her to list, fill, and sink. All 10 people on board survived, but she was declared a total loss.

=== 24 February ===
List of shipwrecks: 24 February 1907
Ship	State	Description
Gjøa	Norway	The 3,645 GRT steamship on a passage from Port Talbot for Iquique with a cargo of dynamite and coal ran aground on Maio island and was wrecked. Attempts to refloat her failed and she broke up and was abandoned in early April.
Oriole	United States	The laid up motor boat was sunk by high water and ice in the Missouri River at Starcher, South Dakota.

=== 25 February ===
List of shipwrecks: 25 February 1907
Ship	State	Description
William Neely	United States	The schooner developed a leak and was in danger of sinking and anchored in Lookout Bight, North Carolina, beached the next day.

=== 26 February ===
List of shipwrecks: 26 February 1907
Ship	State	Description
Utaca	United States	The tug sank at dock at Pier 41 in the North River. The engineer reported water inflow and a possible hit by a propeller of another steamer.

=== 27 February ===
List of shipwrecks: 27 February 1907
Ship	State	Description
Morancy	United States	The 198-gross register ton schooner sank 70 nautical miles (130 km; 81 mi) south of Monhegan Island off the coast of Maine. All six people on board survived.

=== Unknown date ===
List of shipwrecks: Unknown date February 1907
Ship	State	Description
Anna Austin	United States	The 19-gross register ton sternwheel motor paddle vessel was "cut down by ice" on the Missouri River at Ponca, Nebraska. Both people on board survived.

== March ==
=== 1 March ===
List of shipwrecks: 1 March 1907
Ship	State	Description
Corona	United States	With 153 people on board, the 1,492-gross register ton iron-hulled screw steamer was stranded on the bar at Humboldt Bay on the coast of California. A seaman sent out on a lifeboat to render assistance drowned. Sources disagree on the fate of the other people one board, claiming both that they all survived and that two passengers were killed. Survivors were rescued by the United States Life-Saving Service. Corona was declared a total loss.
Pearl M.	United States	The 11-gross register ton screw steamer burned in 7 to 10 feet (2.1 to 3.0 m) of water at East Deglaize near Patterson, Louisiana. All three people on board survived, but she was declared a total loss.

=== 3 March ===
List of shipwrecks: 3 March 1907
Ship	State	Description
Dakota	United States	Dakota one hour after she struck the reef. The 20,714-gross register ton iron-hulled Great Northern Steamship Company screw steamer was wrecked on a reef in the Pacific Ocean off either Shirahama or Yokohama (sources disagree), Japan in fog. All 376 people on board abandoned ship in her lifeboats and survived. She later was scrapped on site. At her launch in 1905 she and her sister ship Minnesota (United States) were the largest passenger ships ever built in the United States.
Juniata	United States	The 9-gross register ton screw steamer ran aground on a reef near Sucia Island in Puget Sound on the coast of Washington. All three people on board survived, but she was declared a total loss.
Luise Horn	German Empire	The 262.5-foot (80.0 m), 1,326-ton cargo vessel was lost in an explosion in the North Sea. Seventeen crew lost.
Oakland	United States	The motor vessel struck bottom and was damaged off the south jetty in Humboldt Bay on the coast of California after she went off course due to a missing buoy. She was beached to prevent her from sinking.

=== 4 March ===
List of shipwrecks: 4 March 1907
Ship	State	Description
Congo	United Kingdom	The Elder Dempster 1,687 GRT cargo/passenger ship was sunk after colliding with Nerissa (flag unknown) near Borkum, Netherlands at the Mouth of the Ems River.

=== 5 March ===
List of shipwrecks: 5 March 1907
Ship	State	Description
Gymnote	French Navy	The submarine ran aground. She was refloated, but became a total loss when she sank on 19 June while drydocked for repairs.

=== 6 March ===
List of shipwrecks: 6 March 1907
Ship	State	Description
Fillmore	United States	The 50-gross register ton schooner was stranded in Boston Harbor on the coast of Massachusetts. Both people on board survived.
John J. Ward	United States	The 295-gross register ton schooner dragged anchor in a heavy squall and snowstorm and struck the breakwater at Lewes, Delaware and sank. All six people on board survived.

=== 7 March ===
List of shipwrecks: 7 March 1907
Ship	State	Description
Dundonald	United Kingdom	The barque ran aground on Disappointment Island in the Auckland Islands south of New Zealand and sank. Twelve of crew drowned, and one other subsequently died. The remaining 15 crew members were shipwrecked for seven months until rescued by the government steamer NZGSS Hinemoa (New Zealand).

=== 8 March ===
List of shipwrecks: 8 March 1907
Ship	State	Description
F. Y. Batchelor	United States	The laid-up steamer was sunk by ice at Running Water, South Dakota. She was a total loss.
Stanley H. Minor	United States	The 696-gross register ton schooner was stranded on the Frying Pan Shoals off the coast of North Carolina. All eight people on board survived.
Susie B.	United States	The laid-up ferry was sunk by ice at Running Water, South Dakota. She was a total loss.
William H. Bailey	United States	The 489-gross register ton schooner was abandoned off Cape Hatteras, North Carolina. All six people on board survived.
Woolton	United Kingdom	The 209 nrt schooner, on a voyage from Fowey, Cornwall, United Kingdom to Hamburg, Germany, with china-clay, was wrecked on the Haaks Sands in the Nieuwediep, near Den Helder, Netherlands. All hands were lost.

=== 9 March ===
List of shipwrecks: 9 March 1907
Ship	State	Description
Ryder	United States	The barge was sunk in a collision with Dover (United States) in the Delaware River in the Horseshoe ranges.

=== 10 March ===
List of shipwrecks: 10 March 1907
Ship	State	Description
John H. Kuck	United States	The 16-gross register ton schooner was stranded at Lockwoods Folly Inlet on the coast of North Carolina. Both people on board survived.

=== 12 March ===
List of shipwrecks: 12 March 1907
Ship	State	Description
Hattie Douglas	United States	The 13-gross register ton schooner was "cut down by ice" off Sandy Hook, New Jersey. All three people on board survived.
Iéna	French Navy	After the explosion The battleship was destroyed by an on-board explosion caused by the spontaneous ignition of nitrocellulose while in drydock at Toulon, France, killing 118. Burning fragments started a small fire aboard the battleship Suffren (French Navy) in an adjacent drydock. Reduced to a hulk for ordnance trials, then sank on 2 December 1909.

=== 13 March ===
List of shipwrecks: 13 March 1907
Ship	State	Description
Cruiser	United States	The steamer struck the wall of Lock No. 3, Ohio River in fog and sank. One crewman was killed. Survivors escaped in yawls.
Hattie	United States	The coal boat was sunk in a collision with Baltic (United Kingdom) in the North River off Desbrosses Street.
Jessie	United States	The 7-gross register ton sternwheel motor paddle vessel sank in the Ohio River. Both people on board survived.
Landseer	United States	The 1,372-gross register ton schooner barge or scow barge sank off Absecon, New Jersey. All four people on board survived.
Ryder	United States	The barge, under tow of M. E. Scully (United States), sprung a leak and sank in the Atlantic Ocean between Little Egg Harbor and Brigantine Shoal in a strong wind, rough seas, and fog. The crew were rescued by M. E. Scully.
Winnifred	United States	While tied up at the mouth of Tenmile Creek on the Monongahela River in Pennsylvania, the 10-gross register ton sternwheel paddle steamer was swept away by a flood and was wrecked at Brownsville, Pennsylvania. All four people on board survived, but she foundered and was abandoned.

=== 14 March ===
List of shipwrecks: 14 March 1907
Ship	State	Description
Crescent	United States	The tug was sunk in a collision in thick fog with the steamer Margaret (United States) at dock on the south side of Pier 1 in the North River in New York City. Raised and repaired.
Gowanburn	United Kingdom	The steamer was stranded in thick fog on the coast of Long Island, New York, 12 miles (19 km) east of Fire Island Light, and 800 yards (730 m) southwest of the United States Life-Saving Service station at Blue Point, New York. The U.S. Life Saving Service rescued her crew. She was refloated on 23 March. One member of the wrecking crew died during the salvage operation.
Queen City	United States	The 94-foot (29 m), 114- or 115-gross register ton steam screw coastal cargo ship burned and sank either while tied up at a dock in the harbor at Sakonnet, Rhode Island, or while off Sakonnet Point on the coast of Rhode Island (sources differ). All six people on board survived.

=== 17 March ===
List of shipwrecks: 17 March 1907
Ship	State	Description
Suevic	United Kingdom	The wreck of Suevic The White Star Line passenger ship ran aground in thick fog and heavy seas on Lizard Point, Cornwall, England on 17 March 1907. Four lifeboats saved 456 people from the wreck, the largest number ever saved by the Royal National Lifeboat Institution from a single vessel. Her wreck later was blown in half by salvagers using dynamite. Her stern section was taken to Southampton to be attached to a new bow. The old bow was left on the rocks.
Tronador	Netherlands	The steamer ran aground and was wrecked near Chanaral, Chile.

=== 18 March ===
List of shipwrecks: 18 March 1907
Ship	State	Description
Gondolier	United States	The steamer was fired upon by angry townspeople fearful that her wake would flood their homes during a high water event on the Kanawha River at Charleston, West Virginia. 15 rounds holed her hull causing her to be beached.
Jebba	United Kingdom	Jebba The steamer, on voyage from West Africa to Plymouth and Liverpool, ran aground at Bolt Tail in thick fog and heavy seas and was wrecked. All seventy-nine passengers, mostly soldiers, and her crew of seventy-six, were rescued by breeches buoy.
Newstead	United Kingdom	The steamer ran aground near Cuckmere, England, in thick fog and heavy seas. Despite being declared a total loss, she was refloated, repaired, and returned to service.

=== 19 March ===
List of shipwrecks: 19 March 1907
Ship	State	Description
Northwestern	United States	The steamer ran aground on a reef when a storm pushed her onto a reef in Beatson Bay near Latouche. Refloated sometime in April.
Tioga	United States	The tow canal boat, under tow of Alpha (United States), was pushed by an ebb tide in the cribbing of the Grays Ferry Bridge causing her to sink in the Schuylkill River in 15 feet (4.6 m) of water.
Walter J. Tice	United States	The tug was sunk at dock when a car float broke loose from tug Sayre (United States) in the North River off Gansevoort Street striking her stern causing her to roll over and sink. Two rail cars were lost off the float.

=== 21 March ===
List of shipwrecks: 21 March 1907
Ship	State	Description
Minnette	United States	The 23-gross register ton schooner was lost off San Francisco, California, when she collided with the barge Ruth (United States). Both people on board survived.

=== 22 March ===
List of shipwrecks: 22 March 1907
Ship	State	Description
Elsia Marie	United States	The 16-gross register ton sloop sank in the Gulf of Mexico off Florida between Anclote Key and Egmont Key. The only person on board survived.
Mystery	United States	The 31-gross register ton schooner capsized off Point Pedro, California with the loss of all four people on board.

=== 23 March ===
List of shipwrecks: 23 March 1907
Ship	State	Description
John Lambert	United States	The 30-gross register ton schooner was stranded off Angel Island in San Francisco Bay on the coast of California. Both people on board survived.

=== 24 March ===
List of shipwrecks: 24 March 1907
Ship	State	Description
J. F. Whitcomb	United States	The 167-gross register ton schooner was stranded on the beach on Assateague Island on the coast of Virginia. All five people on board survived.

=== 25 March ===
List of shipwrecks: 25 March 1907
Ship	State	Description
Samson	United States	The laid up steamer was sunk by ice at Winona, Minnesota.

=== 27 March ===
List of shipwrecks: 27 March 1907
Ship	State	Description
Arthur C. Wade	United States	The 699-gross register ton schooner was stranded on the St. Helena Shoal in the Savannah River in South Carolina. All seven people on board survived.
Julia	United States	The 798-gross register ton bark was stranded at Arecibo, Puerto Rico. All 13 people on board survived.

=== 28 March ===
List of shipwrecks: 28 March 1907
Ship	State	Description
Clarke Oil Tank No. 3	United States	The 512-gross register ton barge sank in the harbor at Galveston, Texas. All four people on board survived.
Kilbrennan	United Kingdom	The 3,640 GRT steamer on a voyage from Barry to Diego Suarez with coal ran aground on Fish Point, near Port Alfred and subsequently wrecked.

=== 30 March ===
List of shipwrecks: 30 March 1907
Ship	State	Description
Lillie	United States	The schooner was wrecked at Unalaska in the Aleutian Islands.
Rita	United States	The 29-gross register ton motor yacht departed Miami, Florida, bound for New York City with eight people on board and was never heard from again.

=== Unknown date ===
List of shipwrecks: 18 March 1907
Ship	State	Description
Fairhaven	United States	The sternwheel paddle steamer was blown onto the dock at Coupeville, Washington, during a gale, and then on to the shore, suffering substantial damage. She was refloated, repaired, and returned to service.

== April ==
=== 1 April ===
List of shipwrecks: 1 April 1907
Ship	State	Description
Hereford	Norway	The barque was wrecked at Hatteras Island, North Carolina, United States with the loss of three of her crew. Survivors were rescued by Olivemore (flag unknown). Hereford was on a voyage from Pensacola, Florida, to Buenos Aires, Argentina.
John D. Dailey	United States	The tug was sunk in a collision with the ferry Musconetcong (United States) in the North River off Christopher Street in New York City. Two crewmen were killed.
Mascotte	United States	The laid-up steamer sank at dock at Hancock, Michigan.
Sarah	United States	While no one was on board, the 11-gross register ton sloop was stranded at Pensacola, Florida.

=== 2 April ===
List of shipwrecks: 2 April 1907
Ship	State	Description
Odiak	United States	The steamer, while under tow by Alitak (United States), sank in a gale off Port Etches in 10 fathoms (60 ft; 18 m) of water.

=== 3 April ===
List of shipwrecks: 3 April 1907
Ship	State	Description
Arthur Sewall	United States	The 3,209-gross register ton iron-hulled full-rigged ship departed Philadelphia, Pennsylvania, bound for Seattle, Washington, with 28 people on board and was never heard from again.

=== 4 April ===
List of shipwrecks: 4 April 1907
Ship	State	Description
Blue Wing	United States	The steamer struck an obstruction in the Kentucky River near Steels Landing and sank in 15 feet (4.6 m) of water. Raised and repaired.
W. C. Jutte	United States	The steamer struck a hidden obstruction off Twenty-Sixth Street, Pittsburgh, Pennsylvania on the Allegheny River and sank. One crewman was killed.

=== 5 April ===
List of shipwrecks: 5 April 1907
Ship	State	Description
City of Troy	United States	The 1,527-gross register ton sidewheel paddle steamer caught fire on the Hudson River off Yonkers, New York. While her crew fought the fire, she docked at Gould's Dock at Dobbs Ferry, New York, on the Hudson River and landed her passengers. All 124 passengers and crew survived, but the fire destroyed the vessel.
S. R. Lane	United States	The 72-gross register ton schooner sank off Mile End in Boston, Massachusetts. All three people on board survived.

=== 7 April ===
List of shipwrecks: 7 April 1907
Ship	State	Description
William D. Becker	United States	The 1,046-gross register ton schooner barge or scow barge sank off Barnegat, New Jersey. All four people on board survived.

=== 8 April ===
List of shipwrecks: 8 April 1907
Ship	State	Description
Blanch	unknown	The schooner ran aground and was wrecked at Kalbacks Head, Lunenburg, Nova Scotia.
John Moren	United States	The 284-gross register ton sternwheel paddle steamer burned while tied to the riverbank at Cairo, Illinois. The only person on board survived.

=== 9 April ===
List of shipwrecks: 9 April 1907
Ship	State	Description
Frank W. Cummiskey, jr.	United States	The 351-gross register ton barge sank in the Shenandoah River off Newport, Virginia, with the loss of both people on board.
Jerome	United States	The 53-gross register ton schooner was stranded in Mobjack Bay on the coast of Virginia. All four people on board survived.
N. J. Nessen	United States	The steamer was sunk by ice at Pine Lake, Michigan.
Unidentified barge	United States	The tug Dixie (United States) abandoned five barges in the Chesapeake Bay between Wolf Trap and New Point, Virginia. One barge sank, killing two people on board, and one death occurred on another barge.

=== 10 April ===
List of shipwrecks: 10 April 1907
Ship	State	Description
Adolph Ohrig	United States	The 1,448-gross register ton bark departed New York City bound for San Francisco, California, with 18 people on board and was never heard from again.

=== 11 April ===
List of shipwrecks: 11 April 1907
Ship	State	Description
N. J. Nessen	United States	The steamer was running through heavy ice near East Jordan, Michigan, when ice cut through her hull and she sank. Raised and repaired. Crew was rescued.

=== 12 April ===
List of shipwrecks: 12 April 1907
Ship	State	Description
Chinook	United States	The 785-gross register ton barge lost her tow on the bar at Coos Bay, Oregon, and was anchored in the breakers. All six people on board made it to shore in her Lifeboat. On the 13th she dragged anchor, went ashore and broke up. $1,000 worth of property was salvaged.
Everett Webster	United States	The 476-gross register ton schooner was abandoned in the North Atlantic Ocean either off Cape Hatteras, North Carolina, or at 41°41′N 057°10′W (the source provides both locations). All eight people on board survived.

=== 13 April ===
List of shipwrecks: 13 April 1907
Ship	State	Description
Arcadia	United States	The 230-gross register ton screw steamer foundered in a wind and snowstorm off Big Sable, Michigan, on the east side of Lake Michigan between Manistee, Michigan, and Two Rivers, Wisconsin. Sources differ on the number of casualties, saying both that all 12 people on board lost their lives and that 11 people died, another that her captain, his wife, ten crewmen and another captain and his wife, who were passengers, all died.

=== 16 April ===
List of shipwrecks: 16 April 1907
Ship	State	Description
Delta	United States	The steamer caught fire, burned to the water's edge, and sank just below Lock No. 1 opposite Dickerson, West Virginia on the Great Kanawha River.
Lucifer	United Kingdom	The 3,823 GRT steam tanker on a voyage from New York City to Dublin and Belfast with a cargo of oil sprang a leak on 8 April in the Atlantic Ocean about 870 miles from New York and was abandoned and eventually foundered on 16 April. The crew was saved by the steamer Sagami and landed at Falmouth on 28 April.
Sanders	United States	The steamer was damaged crossing the Bar of Little River, South Carolina and sank. Total loss.
Ukiah	United States	The railroad ferry sank at the foot of East Street, San Francisco due to errors in handling the off loading of railroad cars. Later raised.

=== 18 April ===
List of shipwrecks: 18 April 1907
Ship	State	Description
Annie B.	United States	The steamer sank in the St. Johns River off Commodores Point just east of Jacksonville, Florida during a terrific storm. Later raised. Her master was killed.
J. Bonner	United States	The steamer was sunk at dock while fitting out at Vans Harbor, Michigan, when a seacock was opened.
Sanders	United States	The 74-gross register ton screw steamer was stranded on the Little River Bar on the coast of North Carolina. All seven people on board survived.
Sardinian	United States	The 124-gross register ton schooner was stranded on Metinic Island on the coast of Maine. All five people on board survived.

=== 19 April ===
List of shipwrecks: 19 April 1907
Ship	State	Description
HMS Ariel	Royal Navy	The destroyer was wrecked when she struck a breakwater outside Grand Harbour, Valletta, Malta. All of her crew survived and were rescued by the destroyer HMS Bruiser (Royal Navy).

=== 20 April ===
List of shipwrecks: 20 April 1907
Ship	State	Description
Marie Gilbert	United States	The 586-gross register ton motor vessel was stranded on Masson Bar near Mayport, Florida. All eight people on board survived.

=== 21 April ===
List of shipwrecks: 21 April 1907
Ship	State	Description
Catherine G. Howard	United States	The 122-gross register ton schooner was wrecked on Bantam Rocks 1 mile south south west of the Damiscove Island Life Saving Station. Ten dories and other equipment was salvaged. 15 crewmen rescued by private boat and 5 by the United States Life Saving Service.

=== 22 April ===
List of shipwrecks: 22 April 1907
Ship	State	Description
Eden	United States	The 40-gross register ton schooner sank off Billingsport, New Jersey, with the loss of three lives. There were seven survivors.
Susquehanna	United States	The barge, under tow of Elmer E. Keeler (United States), foundered three miles (4.8 km) west of the Cornfield lightship in Block Island Sound. Her captain died.

=== 23 April ===
List of shipwrecks: 23 April 1907
Ship	State	Description
American Eagle	United States	The 18-gross register ton schooner was stranded on the York Spit Bar on the coast of Virginia. Both people on board survived.
Attaquin	United States	The sail and steam yacht was wrecked on Two Cay Reef, British Honduras.
Charles W. Parker	United States	The 57-gross register ton schooner was stranded in dense fog and sank at Absecon Inlet on the coast of New Jersey. She was stripped and abandoned. All 11 people on board made it to shore in the ship's boat.
Searchlight (or Search Light)	United States	The 9-gross register ton steam screw fishing vessel, or tug, foundered on Lake Huron in a gale. She was lost with all six hands.

=== 24 April ===
List of shipwrecks: 24 April 1907
Ship	State	Description
John Kelderhouse	United States	After the 43-gross register ton steam screw tug sprung a leak on Lake Erie, she was beached near Dunkirk, New York, to prevent her from sinking and was abandoned. All four people on board survived.
Pioneer	United States	The freighter burned at Pier 24 at the foot of Harrison Street, New York City, in the North River.

=== 25 April ===
List of shipwrecks: 25 April 1907
Ship	State	Description
J. Daggit	United States	The 8-gross register ton sloop was destroyed by an explosion in Albemarle Sound on the coast of North Carolina. All four people on board survived.

=== 26 April ===
List of shipwrecks: 26 April 1907
Ship	State	Description
Col. L. F. Peck	United States	The 166-gross register ton canal boat sank off Stamford, Connecticut. The only person on board survived.
Phil Scheckel	United States	The steamer struck a rock and sank off Johnsons Key in four and a half feet (1.4 m) of water. Raised immediately.

=== 27 April ===
List of shipwrecks: 27 April 1907
Ship	State	Description
Radiant	United States	The tug was swamped by a large wave in Chesapeake Bay causing her to careen, fill with water and sink off the Magothy River.
Searchlight	United States	The fishing tug was lost with crew of five (or six) in Lake Michigan outside Harbor Beach, Huron County Michigan. In November 1913 some of the wreckage and the remains of an unknown crewman were found at Harbor Beach after the Great Lakes Storm of 1913.

=== 29 April ===
List of shipwrecks: 29 April 1907
Ship	State	Description
Alexander Nimick	United States	The steamer was running through heavy ice in the Portage River in Michigan when ice stove in her hull and she sank in 16 feet (4.9 m) of water. Raised and repaired.
Anna	United States	The 488-gross register ton schooner was stranded in thick fog on Campobello Island in New Brunswick, or on Nancy Ledge in Quoddy Bay three miles (4.8 km) east of the Quoddy Head, Maine Life Saving Station. She broke up when the tide came in, a total loss. Some property was salvaged. All seven people on board survived.
Buffalo	United States	The 60-gross register ton screw steamer was running through heavy ice in the Portage River in Michigan when ice stove in her hull and she sank in 48 feet (15 m) of water. All six people on board survived.
Fearless	United States	The 24-gross register ton screw steamer burned to the waterline at Colee Dock in Jacksonville, Florida. All four people on board survived.
Lakewood	United States	The 586-gross register ton schooner was lost in a collision with the screw steamer Livingstone (Norway) in the North Atlantic Ocean off Cape Hatteras, North Carolina. All eight people on board survived.
Pilgrim	United States	The 299-gross register ton passenger-cargo ship – a screw steamer – sprung a leak on Lake Huron after hitting ice and was beached at Fort Gratiot, Michigan, to prevent her from sinking, but she was run too far up the beach and became a total loss. She was stripped, abandoned, and broken up. All 31 or 34 people on board were rescued by the United States Life Saving Service.

=== 30 April ===
List of shipwrecks: 30 April 1907
Ship	State	Description
L. B. Johnson	United States	The tow steamer sprung a leak on Lake Erie and was beached. Total loss.
New York Central No. 4	United States	The tug was sunk in a collision in fog with the passenger steamer C. W. Morse (United States) in the North River off Twenty-ninth Street. One crewman was killed. Survivors rescued by C. W. Morse and a tug.

=== Unknown date ===
List of shipwrecks: Unknown April 1907
Ship	State	Description
Alice T. Boardman	United States	The 123-gross register ton schooner, or her remains, sank at dock in Hyannis, Massachusetts, some time in April.
Flamengo	Brazil	The 248-gross register ton steamship sailed from Pará city, Brazil on 22 April and was reported on 30 April to have foundered in the Mapuá River, State of Pará after damaging her propeller.

== May ==
=== 1 May ===
List of shipwrecks: 1 May 1907
Ship	State	Description
L. B. Johnson	United States	The 42-gross register ton screw steamer was stranded at Fairport, Ohio. All four people on board survived.
Maggic	United States	The steamer sank four miles (6.4 km) in the Mississippi Delta above Greenwood, Mississippi, in shallow water. Her wreck burned.
Silverlip	United Kingdom	During a voyage from Singapore to the United Kingdom with a cargo of benzine, the 7,492-gross register ton steam tanker exploded in the Bay of Biscay. Her crew abandoned her while she burned, and she eventually sank.
S. L. Crosby	United States	The steam tug sank after colliding with the steam cargo ship William C. Redfield (United States) near Cranston, New York.
Uncle Sam	United States	The 14-gross register ton motor vessel burned on the Indian River in Florida. All 78 people on board survived.

=== 2 May ===
List of shipwrecks: 2 May 1907
Ship	State	Description
Kenneth W. McNeil	United States	The 261-gross register ton barge sank at New York City. The only person on board survived.

=== 3 May ===
List of shipwrecks: 3 May 1907
Ship	State	Description
Benjamin A. Van Brunt	United States	The schooner was damaged in a collision with schooner Alicia B. Crosby (United States) in the Atlantic Ocean six miles (9.7 km) west south west of the North End lightship. The vessel was towed to shore and beached inside the Delaware breakwater.

=== 4 May ===
List of shipwrecks: 4 May 1907
Ship	State	Description
Unidentified launch	United States	The motor launch was rammed and sunk by the steam yacht Priscilla (United States) when her reverse lever broke leaving the Commercial Wharf in the harbor at Baltimore, Maryland.

=== 6 May ===
List of shipwrecks: 6 May 1907
Ship	State	Description
Gabrielle	United States	The 454-gross register ton brig was stranded at Jacmel, Haiti. All eight people on board survived.

=== 7 May ===
List of shipwrecks: 7 May 1907
Ship	State	Description
William A. Street	United States	The 123-gross register ton canal boat was stranded at Fort Ann Creek, New York. The only person on board survived.

=== 8 May ===
List of shipwrecks: 8 May 1907
Ship	State	Description
Anna J. Kipp	United States	The steam screw tug collided with a scow she was towing and with the screw steamer Momus (United States) in the North River off Pier 25 in New York City, rolled to starboard, filled with water, and sank. One crewman was killed. There were four survivors.

=== 9 May ===
List of shipwrecks: 9 May 1907
Ship	State	Description
Nellie	Canada	The schooner was wrecked when she ran aground on Rooneys Point.

=== 10 May ===
List of shipwrecks: 10 May 1907
Ship	State	Description
A. J. McBrier	United States	The 111-gross register ton screw steamer burned to the waterline in Georgian Bay in Ontario, after leaving Maxon Mill on Drummond Island in Michigan. All four people on board survived.

=== 11 May ===
List of shipwrecks: 11 May 1907
Ship	State	Description
Edgar	United States	The steamer caught fire at the mouth of the Pearl River and was scuttled in 40 feet (12 m) of water to save what was not burned.
E. H. Heath	United States	The steamer was sunk when she collided with the center post of the Belt Railway of Chicago Bridge in the Chicago Drainage Canal due to the wheelman falling asleep. Later raised.
May	United States	The 169-gross register ton canal boat was stranded on Wards Island in New York City. The only person on board survived.
Sagamore	United States	Carrying a cargo of coal, the 220-foot (67 m), 1,415-gross register ton four-masted schooner sank in 80 feet (24 m) of water in Nantucket Sound off East Chop, Martha's Vineyard, Massachusetts, at 41°28.701′N 070°32.981′W after colliding with the steamer Edda (Norway).

=== 12 May ===
List of shipwrecks: 12 May 1907
Ship	State	Description
Byron Whitaker	United States	The steamer sank after colliding with the steamer John C. Gault (United States) in the Detroit River near the head of Bois Blanc Island off Michigan in Lake Huron.
City of Cleveland	United States	The new steamer, fitting out at the Detroit Shipbuilding Company, Detroit, Michigan, caught fire, burned and partially sank at dock. Everything wood was consumed. Her hull and machinery survived. She was raised and repaired, entering service in 1908.
Sagamore	United States	The 1,415-gross register ton schooner was lost when she collided with the screw steamer Edla (Norway) in Vineyard Sound off the coast of Massachusetts. All 10 people on board survived.

=== 14 May ===
List of shipwrecks: 14 May 1907
Ship	State	Description
Robert	United States	While under tow by the steamer Ramos (United States), the 406-gross register ton steel-hulled schooner barge or scow barge filled with water and sank in 22 fathoms (132 ft; 40 m) of water off Barilles Reef near Culebra Island off Puerto Rico.
Unidentified	United States	Four barges in tow of Bulley (United States) foundered in a heavy gale in Long Island Sound approaching Norwalk, Connecticut. The master of one barge died. Three of the four barges were later raised.

=== 15 May ===
List of shipwrecks: 15 May 1907
Ship	State	Description
Marie-Therese	Belgium	The vessel foundered 60 nautical miles (110 km) off Toulon, France.

=== 16 May ===
List of shipwrecks: 16 May 1907
Ship	State	Description
Ellen M. Mitchell	United States	The 379-gross register ton schooner was stranded and wrecked on Stanley Ledge, west of Great Wass Island on the coast of Maine. All seven people on board were rescued by the United States Life Saving Service.

=== 17 May ===
List of shipwrecks: 17 May 1907
Ship	State	Description
Marian	United States	The 258-gross register ton schooner was stranded on the coast of Mexico at Tupilco, southwest of Frontera. All seven people on board survived.

=== 18 May ===
List of shipwrecks: 18 May 1907
Ship	State	Description
Morena	Canada	The steamer was wrecked near Cape Ray, Newfoundland.

=== 20 May ===
List of shipwrecks: 20 May 1907
Ship	State	Description
Chanzy	French Navy	The Amiral Charner-class armored cruiser was wrecked without loss of life in heavy fog on rocks off Ballard Island in the Chusan Islands while departing Shanghai, China. Her crew abandoned the wreck on 1 June, and French Navy cruisers demolished it on 12 June.
Izaro	Spain	The steamer ran aground at the foot of Tomlin Rock, St Bees.

=== 21 May ===
List of shipwrecks: 21 May 1907
Ship	State	Description
Naomi	United States	The 1,181-gross register ton steel-hulled screw steamer burned on Lake Michigan 28 nautical miles (52 km; 32 mi) west of Grand Haven, Michigan, a total loss, with the loss of five lives. 86 survivors were rescued by Kansas (United States).
Pinta	United States	The 9-gross register ton yawl-rigged yacht, or Motor Launch, burned at Cocoa, Florida, or while beached at Holland, Michigan. Both people on board survived.

=== 22 May ===
List of shipwrecks: 22 May 1907
Ship	State	Description
Chevalier	United States	The 67-gross register ton sternwheel passenger paddle steamer was destroyed by a fire that started while she was tied up at the Chesapeake and Ohio Railway Wharf at Huntington, West Virginia.

=== 23 May ===
List of shipwrecks: 23 May 1907
Ship	State	Description
M. Moran	United States	The canal boat sank at dock at One Hundred and Fifty-Sixth Street, New York City in the East River. Raised and repaired.

=== 25 May ===
List of shipwrecks: 25 May 1907
Ship	State	Description
Rita Newman	United States	Operating in dense fog with her marine chronometer seven minutes off, the 182-gross register ton, 94-foot (28.7 m) motor vessel ran onto rocks off Simeonof Island (54°54′N 159°16′W) in the Shumagin Islands off the south coast of the District of Alaska and was wrecked.

=== 26 May ===
List of shipwrecks: 26 May 1907
Ship	State	Description
Kate Cannon	United States	The steamer was beached at Mayport, Florida, to examine bearings, but filled and sank. Later raised.
Mary Gregory	United States	The schooner was wrecked three miles (4.8 km) west of the Bois Blanc, Michigan Life Saving Station on Lake Huron.

=== 27 May ===
List of shipwrecks: 27 May 1907
Ship	State	Description
Israel W. Durham	United States	The 329-gross register ton steel-hulled barge was stranded on Bird Shoal off the coast of North Carolina. Both people on board survived.

=== 29 May ===
List of shipwrecks: 29 May 1907
Ship	State	Description
Lydia B. Cowperthwaite	United States	The 271-gross register ton barge sank in Long Island Sound off the coast of New York. The only person on board survived.
Marec	United Kingdom	The 107.5-foot (32.8 m) 182-ton fishing vessel was wrecked on Hindegrind Rocks, Isle of Foula.
Wizard	United States	The 139-gross register ton screw steamer sank off Punta Gorda, California. All 12 people on board survived.

== June ==
=== 1 June ===
List of shipwrecks: 1 June 1907
Ship	State	Description
Emily and Irene	United States	The 33-gross register ton schooner was stranded in Great Peconic Bay on the coast of Long Island, New York. All three people on board survived.
Selwyn Eddy	United States	The steamer was sunk when struck by the barge Maida in the Detroit River in 25 feet (7.6 m) of water 50 feet (15 m) offshore of Ecorse, Michigan.

=== 2 June ===
List of shipwrecks: 2 June 1907
Ship	State	Description
Pactolus	United States	The 1,199-gross register ton schooner barge or scow barge sank in the North Atlantic Ocean off Hog Island in the Virginia Barrier Islands off the coast of Virginia. All four people on board survived.

=== 4 June ===
List of shipwrecks: 4 June 1907
Ship	State	Description
Navarra	United Kingdom	The 3,066 GRT steamer on a voyage from Fernandina to Colon with a cargo of timber ran aground and wrecked on Old Providence Island Reef.
Tourist	United States	The 284-gross register ton screw steamer burned in Albemarle Sound off the coast of North Carolina between Elizabeth City and Columbia. Her entire crew of eight escaped in her lifeboats.

=== 5 June ===
List of shipwrecks: 5 June 1907
Ship	State	Description
Mary Steele	United States	The 69-gross register ton schooner sank off Eastern Point on Cape Ann on the coast of Massachusetts. All four people on board survived.
Viking	Norway	While off Cape Horn, the bark collided with the American shipentine Atlas. Two people from Viking fell between the two ships and were never recovered. Viking drifted and was later found wrecked near Noir Island.

=== 7 June ===
List of shipwrecks: 7 June 1907
Ship	State	Description
LaJalouse	France	The schooner capsized and sank in a storm off Barbados. Her captain and 21 others reached Barbados. 28 passengers, including 12 women and children, drowned.

=== 10 June ===
List of shipwrecks: 10 June 1907
Ship	State	Description
Alcazar	United States	The 263-gross register ton screw steamer tried to proceed to sea from Needle Rock, California, in a storm, but she struck rocks and lost her rudder. She then drifted onto the rocks and was abandoned. All 19 people on board survived, but she was wrecked. Her boiler and machinery were salvaged.
Alma	United States	The 134-gross register ton schooner was abandoned off Saint John, New Brunswick, Canada. All six people on board survived.
Bougainville	France	The schooner sprang a leak and was abandoned in the Bristol Channel 4 nautical miles (7.4 km) off Oxwich Point, Glamorgan, United Kingdom. She subsequently foundered.
Cando	United States	The 74-gross register ton sternwheel paddle steamer sank at Huntington, West Virginia. Both people on board survived.

=== 11 June ===
List of shipwrecks: 11 June 1907
Ship	State	Description
William Duren	United States	The 101-gross register ton schooner was stranded on Western Duck Rock off Monhegan, Maine. All six people on board survived.

=== 12 June ===
List of shipwrecks: 12 June 1907
Ship	State	Description
Worcester	United States	With no one on board, the 14-gross register ton motor vessel burned at Crisfield, Maryland.

=== 13 June ===
List of shipwrecks: 13 June 1907
Ship	State	Description
Kia Ora	New Zealand	The Northern Steamship Company's 307 ton coaster foundered on Piritoki Reef in fog, with the loss of 3 lives.

=== 14 June ===
List of shipwrecks: 14 June 1907
Ship	State	Description
E. A. Shores Jr.	United States	The steamer caught fire at Port Royal Dock in Sault Ste. Marie, Michigan. due to an exploding torch. She filled with water and sank. She later was raised and repaired.

=== 15 June ===
List of shipwrecks: 15 June 1907
Ship	State	Description
Catherine	United States	The 8-gross register ton motor vessel sank off Grand Bahama in the Bahamas. Both people on board survived.
John R. Durkee	United States	The 115-gross register ton canal boat sank off Batiscan, Quebec, Canada. Both people on board survived.

=== 17 June ===
List of shipwrecks: 17 June 1907
Ship	State	Description
Midgard	Germany	The 4,222 GRT steamer on a passage from Newport to Venice with a cargo of coal ran aground and was wrecked on Sorelli Rocks near Malta.

=== 18 June ===
List of shipwrecks: 18 June 1907
Ship	State	Description
Della	United States	The 12-gross register ton sternwheel motor paddle vessel was lost when she struck a pier at Kansas City, Missouri. All four people on board survived.

=== 19 June ===
List of shipwrecks: 19 June 1907
Ship	State	Description
Gymnote	French Navy	The Gymnote-class submarine sank while being drydocked for repairs after her hatch was left open while the drydock was being filled. She was refloated and deemed a total loss. The submarine was discarded in May 1908 and was scrapped.
Louis	United States	The 831-gross register ton schooner was stranded in the South Farallon Islands off the coast of California in dense fog, she was a total loss. All ten people on board were rescued by the United States Life Saving Service.
Prussia	United States	The 1,212-gross register ton bark was stranded on Argentina's Isla de los Estados (known in English as "Staten Island") east of Tierra del Fuego with the loss of four lives. There were nine survivors.
Sardine	United States	With no one on board, the 11-gross register ton scow burned at West Seattle in Seattle, Washington.

=== 20 June ===
List of shipwrecks: 20 June 1907
Ship	State	Description
Crystal Stream	Canada	The sidewheel paddle steamer was destroyed by fire at Coles Island, New Brunswick. Four men burned to death, six injured.
HM Torpedo Boat 99	Royal Navy	The torpedo boat sank without loss of life during steam trials in the English Channel off Torquay, England, after her propeller shaft broke and punctured her hull. Her crew was rescued by the torpedo gunboat HMS Dryad (Royal Navy).

=== 22 June ===
List of shipwrecks: 22 June 1907
Ship	State	Description
Nellie	United States	The steamer sank in 15 feet (4.6 m) of water at while tied to the bank at the mouth of Clarks River near Paducah, Kentucky.
Unknown drydock	United States Navy	The decommissioned drydock from the Portsmouth Naval Shipyard was disposed of by burning off Boston, Massachusetts.

=== 23 June ===
List of shipwrecks: 23 June 1907
Ship	State	Description
Attaquin	United States	The 79-gross register ton steam yacht was stranded at Tuo Cayes, Belize City, British Honduras. All nine people on board survived.
Batchawanna	Canada	The steamer was destroyed by fire off Copper Point in Lake Superior. The crew made it to shore in her boats.
T. Charlton Henry	United States	The 2,421-gross register ton schooner was lost in a collision with the screw steamer Chelston (United Kingdom) in dense fog off Fire Island, New York, or Montauk Point in 200 feet (61 m) of water. All 14 people on board were rescued by Chelston. Wreck located 2011.
Wm. V. Wilson or William. V. Wilson	United States	The passenger steamer burned to the waterline at Port Monmouth, New Jersey. She was declared a total loss.

=== 24 June ===
List of shipwrecks: 24 June 1907
Ship	State	Description
Michael J. Collins	United States	The schooner was damaged in a collision in fog with Two Brothers (United States) in Jamaica Bay causing leaks. Two Brothers towed her into shoal water on Coney Island Beach and took her crew off.

=== 25 June ===
List of shipwrecks: 25 June 1907
Ship	State	Description
Belle Prince	United States	The 68-gross register ton sternwheel paddle steamer sank in the Mississippi River above the waterworks at Natchez, Mississippi, during a wind storm. All 13 people on board survived.
Evangeline	United States	The 22-gross register ton schooner was stranded on Nomans Land off Martha's Vineyard on the coast of Massachusetts. All five people on board survived.
J. Favre Baldwin	United States	The steamer burned and sank at the J. A. Favre Lumber Company Mill, Favreport, Mississippi, when the mill burned down and the fire spread to her.

=== 26 June ===
List of shipwrecks: 26 June 1907
Ship	State	Description
Annie L.	United States	The 90-gross register ton sternwheel paddle steamer was destroyed by fire in the harbor at Mount Vernon, Indiana, along the Ohio River. All nine people on board survived.
Atlas	United States	The 232-gross register ton lighter was damaged when struck by the excursion steamer Theodore Roosevelt (United States) and then sank when she careened off the south abutment of the Clark Street Bridge, Chicago, Illinois, in 28 feet (8.5 m) of water. All six, or 12, people on board survived, but she was declared a total loss.

=== 27 June ===
List of shipwrecks: 27 June 1907
Ship	State	Description
Harry and Ralph	United States	The 11-gross register ton sloop was stranded at Cape Fear on the coast of North Carolina. The only person on board survived.

=== 28 June ===
List of shipwrecks: 28 June 1907
Ship	State	Description
Claira	United States	The tow steamer was damaged in a collision with the ferry Beverly (United States) off Market Street, Camden, New Jersey. The vessel was beached.

=== 29 June ===
List of shipwrecks: 29 June 1907
Ship	State	Description
Lizzie Colby	United States	The 150-gross register ton schooner was wrecked either in Anadyr Bay on the northeast coast of Siberia or in the Gulf of Alaska, according to different reports. All ten people on board survived.
Mildred A. Pope	United States	The 90-gross register ton schooner sank after colliding with the sidewheel paddle steamer Puritan (United States) off Falkner Island in Long Island Sound off Guilford, Connecticut. All three people on board survived.

=== 30 June ===
List of shipwrecks: 30 June 1907
Ship	State	Description
Belle of Jefferson	United States	The laid-up 69-gross register ton sidewheel paddle steamer sprung a leak and sank while tied up at a dock at either Harvey or New Orleans, Louisiana (sources disagree). All five people on board survived.

=== Unknown date ===
List of shipwrecks: Unknown date June 1907
Ship	State	Description
Quinnipiac	United States	The 14-gross register ton motor vessel sank somewhere between Key West and Miami, Florida. The only person on board survived.

== July ==
=== 1 July ===
List of shipwrecks: 1 July 1907
Ship	State	Description
Cartagena	United States	The 1,532-gross register ton screw steamer was stranded at Cape Negro, Nova Scotia, Canada. All 19 people on board survived.

=== 2 July ===
List of shipwrecks: 2 July 1907
Ship	State	Description
City of Lawrence	United States	The 1,678-gross register ton steel-hulled paddle steamer – a cargo liner – struck a rock off Eastern Point, Groton, Connecticut, in dense fog and was wrecked. All 109 people on board survived.
Havana	United States	The steamer was damaged in a collision with the steamer Prescott (United States) in Lock 1 in the Lachine Canal in Montreal, Quebec, Canada, and was beached to prevent her from sinking.
Lizzie Evans	United States	The 117-gross register ton canal boat sank in Hell Gate at New York City. The only person on board survived.

=== 4 July ===
List of shipwrecks: 4 July 1907
Ship	State	Description
Arthur	Norway	The barque was wrecked off Bremnes, Norway.
Virginia	United States	The steamer burned to the waters edge at dock in Berkley, North Carolina.

=== 5 July ===
List of shipwrecks: 5 July 1907
Ship	State	Description
George C. Perkins	United States	The 388-gross register ton barkentine was stranded on the Topolobampo Bar at Mazatlán, Mexico. All nine people on board survived.
Maude Sherwood	United States	The 638-gross register ton schooner was lost in a collision with the schooner Baker Palmer (United States) off Race Point, Cape Cod, Massachusetts. All 10 people on board survived.

=== 6 July ===
List of shipwrecks: 6 July 1907
Ship	State	Description
Denewell	United Kingdom	The 3,091 GRT steamer on a voyage from Larnes to Rotterdam with a cargo of iron ore ran aground and wrecked on Bajo Carraca, 2 miles (3.2 km) north of Cape Finisterre.
Florence	United States	The 49-gross register ton schooner was stranded at Cape Neddick, Maine. All three people on board survived.

=== 7 July ===
List of shipwrecks: 7 July 1907
Ship	State	Description
Annie Emmons	United States	The 28-gross register ton steam screw tug caught fire in Boston Harbor off the coast of Massachusetts halfway between Nahant and Deer Island. Her crew of four abandoned ship and survived. She was beached on Deer Island and was declared a total loss.
P. R. R. No. 7	United States	The tug sank at dock at North Eleventh Street, Brooklyn, New York. Raised and repaired.

=== 8 July ===
List of shipwrecks: 8 July 1907
Ship	State	Description
Little Ruth	United States	The 13-gross register ton sternwheel motor paddle vessel was stranded in the Arkansas River at Ozark, Arkansas. Both people on board survived.
Oden	United States	The 96-gross register ton scow sank at Superior, Wisconsin. Both people on board survived.

=== 9 July ===
List of shipwrecks: 9 July 1907
Ship	State	Description
Free Lance	United States	The tug caught fire while tied up to a stake boat in Newark Bay. She was cut loose and drifted ashore at West Twenty-Fifth Street, Bayonne, New Jersey and burned to the water's edge.

=== 10 July ===
List of shipwrecks: 10 July 1907
Ship	State	Description
Japan	United Kingdom	While under tow from Ketchikan, District of Alaska, to Nobles, British Columbia, Canada, by the vessel Marion (flag unknown), the barge was completely destroyed in Revillagigedo Channel off Bold Island (55°15′N 131°25′W) in the Alexander Archipelago in Southeast Alaska by an explosion of dynamite on board. The explosion killed her entire crew as well as one man aboard Marion.
Success	United States	The 22-gross register ton sloop sank on the Hampton Bar on the coast of Virginia. Both people on board survived.

=== 11 July ===
List of shipwrecks: 11 July 1907
Ship	State	Description
Carroll Boys	United States	The steamer sank over night while tied up in Alloways Creek, New Jersey.
Chrystenah	United States	The steamer struck a sunken pile at her dock in Nyack, New York, and sank.
Wink	United States	The motorboat was sunk in a collision with the tug De Vaux Powell (United States) in Boston Harbor.

=== 12 July ===
List of shipwrecks: 12 July 1907
Ship	State	Description
Natalie B. Nickerson	United States	The 128-gross register ton naptha-powered screw fishing schooner sank with the loss of three lives near the Nantucket Shoals off Nantucket, Massachusetts, after colliding in thick fog with the ocean liner Romanic (United Kingdom). Romanic rescued her 15 or 16 (sources disagree) survivors.
Shepherd King	United States	The 121-gross register ton schooner was lost off Nantucket, Massachusetts, in a collision with the screw steamer Saratova (Russia). All 11 people on board survived.
Tuscarora	United States	The steamer sank at the Grand Trunk Railway dock at Port Huron, Michigan, after a collision with Maryland (United States.

=== 13 July ===
List of shipwrecks: 13 July 1907
Ship	State	Description
Emma L. Coyne	United States	The barge was sunk in a collision with Wallula (United States) at Detroit, Michigan.

=== 15 July ===
List of shipwrecks: 15 July 1907
Ship	State	Description
Annie C. Thomas	United States	The 8-gross register ton schooner was stranded on Gull Rock in Pamlico Sound on the coast of North Carolina. All four people on board survived.

=== 16 July ===
List of shipwrecks: 16 July 1907
Ship	State	Description
Manatee	United States	The 31-gross register ton schooner burned at Key West, Florida. All three people on board survived.
Toro	Argentina	The cargo ship was wrecked off Chile.
Unidentified pile driver	United States	The pile driver, under tow by the tow steamer Ivanhoe (United States), capsized and sank six and a half miles (10.5 km) southeast of Cape May, New Jersey.

=== 17 July ===
List of shipwrecks: 17 July 1907
Ship	State	Description
Ella	United States	The 419-gross register ton, 120.3-foot (36.7 m) cargo vessel – a sternwheel paddle steamer – sank in shallow water on the Tanana River at Tolovana in the central District of Alaska after striking a submerged object, thought to be a snag. Her crew of 20 survived. Her machinery was salvaged, but her hull was a total loss.

=== 18 July ===
List of shipwrecks: 18 July 1907
Ship	State	Description
Tennessee	United States	The steamer was caught in a whirlwind and hurled against the Eads Bridge, St. Louis, Missouri, knocking a large hole in her side. She was beached.

=== 19 July ===
List of shipwrecks: 19 July 1907
Ship	State	Description
Fido	Norway	Fido aground off Tweed Heads, New South Wales, Australia The 1,433 GRT cargo and passenger ship was wrecked on a reef off Cook's Island, near Tweed Heads on the border between New South Wales and Queensland in Australia.

=== 20 July ===
List of shipwrecks: 20 July 1907
Ship	State	Description
Say When	United States	The yacht struck Sturgeon Shoal in the St. Lawrence River and filled. Later refloated and taken to Kingston, Ontario, Canada for repairs.

=== 21 July ===
List of shipwrecks: 21 July 1907
Ship	State	Description
Columbia	United States	Columbia sinking after colliding with San Pedro The 2,721-gross register ton steel-hulled San Francisco and Portland Steamship Company passenger-cargo ship – a screw steamer – collided with the steam schooner San Pedro (United States) in dense fog off Shelter Cove, California. Columbia subsequently sank off Point Arena, California, killing either 80 or 88 (sources disagree), including her Captain and 1st Officer and all children on board, of the 227, or 248, people on board. Although badly damaged and flooded, San Pedro remained afloat. San Pedro rescued Columbia's survivors and a few of those were killed when her mast collapsed. They were transferred to the coastal liner George W. Elder and the steamship Roanoke (both United States).

=== 22 July ===
List of shipwrecks: 22 July 1907
Ship	State	Description
Jimmie	United States	The tow steamer sank over night, found sunk on morning of 23 July. An attempt to raise her on 24 July wrecked her. Her hull was then beached. The vessel's boiler and engine were salvaged.

=== 23 July ===
List of shipwrecks: 23 July 1907
Ship	State	Description
C. E. Taylor	United States	With no one on board, the 79-gross register ton sternwheel paddle steamer broke loose in a storm on the Black River at Black Rock, Arkansas, and sank.

=== 25 July ===
List of shipwrecks: 25 July 1907
Ship	State	Description
E. Jax	United States	With no one on board, the 219-gross register ton barge was abandoned at sea off Race Rocks Light off the southern tip of Vancouver Island, British Columbia, Canada.

=== 26 July ===
List of shipwrecks: 26 July 1907
Ship	State	Description
Pardon G. Thompson	United States	The 171-gross register ton schooner was stranded in the Bay of Fundy on Grand Manan in New Brunswick, Canada. All five people on board survived.

=== 27 July ===
List of shipwrecks: 27 July 1907
Ship	State	Description
Frontenac	United States	The paddlewheel steamer caught fire on Lake Cayuga, New York in rough weather between Levanna and Farley's Point off Union Springs, New York, and burned to the waterline after being beached. Scrapped in place during World War II. Seven women and children drowned and one child burned to death.

=== 28 July ===
List of shipwrecks: 28 July 1907
Ship	State	Description
Climax	United States	The 58-gross register ton sternwheel paddle steamer struck an obstruction on the Mississippi River near Luna Landing, Arkansas, punching two holes in her hull. She was beached on a bar at Carters Point, Mississippi, but sank. All eight people on board survived.
Wm. F. Havemeyer	United States	The 110-gross register ton screw steamer burned at New York City. Both people on board survived.

=== 30 July ===
List of shipwrecks: 30 July 1907
Ship	State	Description
Brothers	United Kingdom	The ketch foundered off Cardigan. Her three crew were rescued by Elizabeth Austin ( Royal National Lifeboat Institution).

=== 31 July ===
List of shipwrecks: 31 July 1907
Ship	State	Description
Ice King	United States	The tug was sunk in a collision with passenger steamer Poukeepsie (United States) in the North River off the Delaware, Lackawanna, and Western Railroad Ferry Dock, Jersey City, New Jersey. Crew taken off by Poukeepsie and the tug Hugh J. Bond (United States). Ice King was raised on 2 August and repaired.
New Daniel	United States	The steamer sprung a leak and sank laying on the bank at Patterson, Louisiana.

=== Unknown date ===
List of shipwrecks: Unknown date 1907
Ship	State	Description
Meteor	United States	The launch was lost on Kayak Island on the south-central coast of the District of Alaska.

== August ==
=== 1 August ===
List of shipwrecks: 1 August 1907
Ship	State	Description
Arrow	United States	The motor vessel was sunk in a collision with the ferry boat No. 3 (United States) in the Detroit River near the Belle Isle Bridge. One person was killed.
Muncy	United States	The steamer was sunk by her own tow line at Chicago, Illinois.

=== 2 August ===
List of shipwrecks: 2 August 1907
Ship	State	Description
Kongo	United States	The steamer struck a dock in the Chicago River and then swung across the river striking a mud on the tow line and sinking.

=== 3 August ===
List of shipwrecks: 3 August 1907
Ship	State	Description
Saretta	United States	The 34-gross register ton screw steamer burned at Newport, Washington. All three people on board survived.

=== 4 August ===
List of shipwrecks: 4 August 1907
Ship	State	Description
Nettie Grant	United States	The steamer sank in the Kentucky River at Frankfort, Kentucky. She was raised on 12 August.
Quickstep	United States	The 12-gross register ton sternwheel motor paddle vessel sank at Prices Mill, Arkansas. Both people on board survived.

=== 6 August ===
List of shipwrecks: 6 August 1907
Ship	State	Description
Helen F. Whitten	United States	The 134-gross register ton schooner sank off Blanc-Sablon, Quebec, Canada. All 18 people on board survived.
Telephone	United States	The water tender capsized and sank after the steamer Kennebeck (United States) struck her while she was tied up at Lincoln Wharf in the harbor at Boston, Massachusetts.

=== 9 August ===
List of shipwrecks: 9 August 1907
Ship	State	Description
City of Carthage	United Kingdom	The 5,524 GRT steamship while on passage from Philadelphia to Hiogo with cargo of case oil ran aground and wrecked at Kamodasaki, Awa prefecture.
John Currier	United States	During a voyage from Nushagak, District of Alaska, to Astoria, Oregon, with either 245 people – 140 passengers and a crew of 105 – or 272 people (sources disagree) and a cargo of 2,200 cases of canned salmon on board, the 1,945-gross register ton, 235.8-foot (71.9 m) wooden full-rigged ship became stranded on a sand bar near Cape Rozhnof (55.9666667°N 160.9402778°W) and Nelson Lagoon on the north coast of the Alaska Peninsula in thick fog and filled with water over the next two hours. All on board reached shore in her boats and eventually were rescued by the revenue cutter USRC McCulloch ( United States Revenue Cutter Service). John Currier broke up on 10 September during a gale.

=== 11 August ===
List of shipwrecks: 11 August 1907
Ship	State	Description
Idlewild	United States	The 17-gross register ton schooner-rigged yacht was stranded at Coney Island in Brooklyn, New York. All seven people on board survived.
Montpelier	United States	The 290-gross register ton schooner sank in the Detroit River off Belle Isle in Michigan. All six people on board survived.

=== 12 August ===
List of shipwrecks: 12 August 1907
Ship	State	Description
Henry A. Litchfield	United States	The 593-gross register ton schooner barge or scow barge burned off Cape Henry, Virginia. All three people on board survived.
Myronus	United States	Carrying a cargo of granite blocks, the 118-foot (36.0 m), 283-gross register ton three-masted schooner sank in 60 feet (18 m) of water two minutes after colliding with the screw steamer Tennessee (United States) in thick fog in Long Island Sound a few miles west of Stratford Shoal and 5 nautical miles (9.3 km; 5.8 mi) northeast of Eatons Neck, Long Island, New York. The collision almost cut Myronus in two. Four crewmen were killed. There were two survivors.
Traveler	United States	The 172-gross register ton schooner was stranded on East Reef in Long Island Sound. All five people on board survived.

=== 13 August ===
List of shipwrecks: 13 August 1907
Ship	State	Description
San Jose	United States	The steamer struck a snag and sank in seven feet (2.1 m) of water in the Mokelumne River. Later raised.

=== 15 August ===
List of shipwrecks: 15 August 1907
Ship	State	Description
Dawn	United States	The 12-gross register ton naptha screw vessel was stranded on Trinidad Head on the coast of California. All three people on board survived.
Hiawatha	United States	The steamer sprung a leak near Two Creeks, Wisconsin, and was run aground in shoal water to prevent sinking. Later pumped out.
Redskin III	United States	The 33-gross register ton schooner-rigged yacht burned in the harbor at Argyle, Nova Scotia, Canada. All six people on board survived.

=== 16 August ===
List of shipwrecks: 16 August 1907
Ship	State	Description
Aid	United States	The steamer sprang a leak and sank at dock overnight at Allegheny, Pennsylvania, on the Ohio River. Raised, repaired and returned to service.
Alice	United States	The 55-gross register ton, 61.6-foot (18.8 m) fishing steamer struck a rock in fog and sank off Danger Point (56°31′N 132°55′W) in Wrangell Narrows in Southeast Alaska. Her crew of seven survived. She was refloated, repaired, and returned to service.
S & W	United States	With no one on board, the 8-gross register ton screw steamer sank in the Ohio River at Dayton, Kentucky.
Tillie E. Starbuck	United States	The 2,025-gross register ton steel-hulled full-rigged ship was abandoned in the Pacific Ocean off Coquimbo, Chile and then scuttled by burning after being disabled on 31 July in a gale at (33°40′S 84°40′W). All 25 people on board rescued by Cambus Kenneth (United Kingdom).

=== 18 August ===
List of shipwrecks: 18 August 1907
Ship	State	Description
Blue Star	United States	The 32-gross register ton screw steamer burned in Mud Bay at the southern end of Eld Inlet on the coast of Washington in Puget Sound. All four people on board survived.

=== 19 August ===
List of shipwrecks: 19 August 1907
Ship	State	Description
Quail	United Kingdom	The 106-foot (32 m), 144-ton steam trawler ran aground on Foul Holme Sand off the Killingholme Lighthouse. She floated off at 1:30 AM on 20 August and was moved and anchored in the middle of the channel. An hour and a quarter later she was sunk while still at anchor in The Humber off North Killingholme Haven by Dynamo (United Kingdom). Her captain and one crewman were killed. Raised, repaired, lengthened and returned to service.

=== 21 August ===
List of shipwrecks: 21 August 1907
Ship	State	Description
Bender Brothers	United States	The 84-gross register ton schooner was stranded in Good News Bay on the coast of the District of Alaska. All nine people on board survived.
Robert K. Cassatt	United States	The tow steamer caught fire in the Delaware River and was beached on the New Jersey side near Billingsport, New Jersey. Total loss.
S. W. Gee	United States	The tug suddenly capsized and sank in the harbor of Buffalo, New York. Two crewmen were killed.

=== 22 August ===
List of shipwrecks: 22 August 1907
Ship	State	Description
Abeille	France	The tug, on a voyage from Dunkirk, France to Oskarshamn, Sweden, was struck by the steamship Minerva(Germany) 20 nautical miles (37 km; 23 mi) off Borkum island, in the Wadden Sea, sailing from (Hamburg to Tilbury. The tug sank and twelve of her crew were lost; two survivors were picked up by Minerva.
Hammond	United States	The 14-gross register ton, 41-foot (12.5 m) motor vessel was destroyed off Storey Island (60°43′30″N 147°25′00″W) in Prince William Sound on the south-central coast of the District of Alaska by a fire that started when her engine backfired, igniting oil in her bilge. Sources differ on how many people were aboard. According to one source, her engineer perished, but the other seven people aboard – her captain and six passengers – were rescued by another vessel. Another source claims that two people were on board, one of whom perished.

=== 23 August ===
List of shipwrecks: 23 August 1907
Ship	State	Description
E. T. Carrington	United States	The 52-gross register ton screw steamer sprung a leak and sank between Duluth, Minnesota, and Ashland, Wisconsin, 15 nautical miles (28 km; 17 mi) northeast of Duluth. Her entire crew of four was rescued by the steamer Frederick B. Wells (United States).
F. A. Goebel	United States	The 61-gross register ton sternwheel paddle steamer filled and sank in the Ouachita River while tied up at a dock in Monroe, Louisiana. All four people on board survived. She was raised to salvage her machinery, but otherwise was a total loss.
Hattie Chevalier	United States	The 38-gross register ton schooner sank off Tompkinsville on Staten Island in New York City. All three people on board survived.
Mary	United States	The ferry burned to the waterline, probably on Lake Michigan.

=== 24 August ===
List of shipwrecks: 24 August 1907
Ship	State	Description
Ruby	United States	The 17-gross register ton screw steamer burned at Davis Dock in Jacksonville, Florida. All six people on board survived, but she was declared a total loss.
Watson	United States	The tug sank at dock in Port Huron, Michigan.

=== 25 August ===
List of shipwrecks: 25 August 1907
Ship	State	Description
Gerry	United States	The tug was sunk in a collision with Barnstable (United Kingdom) in Brewerton Channel off the Sparrow Point Channel buoy. Four crewmen, plus the captain of the dredge Standard, in tow by Gerry, who was on board at the time of the accident, were killed. Later raised and docked.
Kate White	United States	The tug went ashore when her wheel chains parted in a north east gale trying to enter Fairport Harbor, Ohio. Total loss.

=== 26 August ===
List of shipwrecks: 26 August 1907
Ship	State	Description
Acapulco	United States	The steamer took a list to starboard, filled with water and sank at San Francisco, California, due to improperly loaded coal and cargo.
King Edward		The passenger steamer struck a reef in the St. Clair River, she floated off and was beached to prevent sinking. Passengers taken off by Frontenac (United States).
Sanford Hay	United States	The laid-up steamer sprang a leak and sank at dock at Allegheny, Pennsylvania, on the Allegheny River. Raised, repaired and returned to service.

=== 27 August ===
List of shipwrecks: 27 August 1907
Ship	State	Description
Doris	United States	The 9-gross register ton sloop burned 1.25 nautical miles (2.3 km; 1.4 mi) northeast of Petit Manan on the coast of Maine. The only person on board survived.
Isaac L. Ellwood	United States	The steamer was sunk in a collision with A. G. Brower (United States) near Bar Point in Lake Erie.
Silberhorn	United Kingdom	The barque was sighted on fire and abandoned. She was on a voyage from Newcastle, New South Wales, Australia to Iquique, Chile. Presumed subsequently foundered.

=== 28 August ===
List of shipwrecks: 28 August 1907
Ship	State	Description
Gracebelle Taylor	United States	The 537-gross register ton schooner was stranded at San Pedro de Macorís, Dominican Republic. All eight people on board survived.

=== 29 August ===
List of shipwrecks: 29 August 1907
Ship	State	Description
Allen	United States	The 8-gross register ton sloop was stranded at the red buoy at York Spit on the coast of Virginia. All five people on board survived.
Lafayette	United States	The steamer struck a snag and sank in the Wabash River near Mt. Carmel, Illinois. Everyone aboard was rescued.
S. S. Hudson	United States	The 429-gross register ton schooner burned southeast of Little Hope, Nova Scotia, Canada. All seven people on board survived.
Standart	Imperial Russian Navy	The Imperial Yacht ran aground off "Granscher Island", Grand Duchy of Finland. She was refloated on 1 September with the assistance of the icebreaker No. 1 (Russia) and taken in to Kronstadt for repairs.

=== 30 August ===
List of shipwrecks: 30 August 1907
Ship	State	Description
Carrie and Annie	United States	The 95-gross register ton schooner was wrecked on the coast of Siberia in Shanta Bay, an arm of the Sea of Okhotsk. All 16 people on board survived.

=== Unknown date ===
List of shipwrecks: Unknown date August 1907
Ship	State	Description
HMS Commonwealth	Royal Navy	The King Edward VII-class battleship ran aground. She was refloated, repaired, and returned to service.

== September ==
=== 2 September ===
List of shipwrecks: 2 September 1907
Ship	State	Description
James S. Steele	United States	The 78-gross register ton schooner was stranded in Vineyard Sound on the coast of Massachusetts. All ten people on board survived.

=== 3 September ===
List of shipwrecks: 3 September 1907
Ship	State	Description
Coal King	United States	The schooner barge or scow barge, under tow by the steamer Edgar F. Luckenbach (United States), foundered in a gale 25 nautical miles (46 km; 29 mi) southwest of Montauk Point, Long Island, New York. Her entire crew of four was rescued by Edgar F. Luckenbach.
Henry M. Stanley	United States	The 293-gross register ton sternwheel paddle steamer was sunk in a collision with the Corps of Engineers dredge Oswego ( United States Army) on the Ohio River at the foot of Gallipolis Island along the riverbank at Gallipolis, Ohio. She sanking in nine feet (2.7 m) of water. All 71 people on board survived.
Majestic	United States	The 17-gross register ton motor vessel burned on Lake Pontchartrain in Louisiana. All five people on board survived.
Phineas H. Gay	United States	The 109-gross register ton schooner sank in Boston Harbor on the coast of Massachusetts. All four people on board survived.

=== 4 September ===
List of shipwrecks: 4 September 1907
Ship	State	Description
Excelsior	United States	The 518-gross register ton barge, under tow by the steamer Elmer A. Keeler (United States), was cut loose by Elmer A. Keeler due to bad weather and grounded off Watch Hill, Rhode Island. The only person on board survived.
P. R. R. 701	United States	The 310-gross register ton barge, under tow by the steamer W. E. Gladwish (United States), was cut loose by W. E. Gladwish due to bad weather and either grounded on or sank off (sources disagree) Watch Hill Point off Watch Hill, Rhode Island. The only person on board survived.

=== 6 September ===
List of shipwrecks: 6 September 1907
Ship	State	Description
Decorra	United States	The 181-gross register ton schooner was abandoned at sea off Nash Island on the coast of Maine. All five people on board survived.

=== 8 September ===
List of shipwrecks: 8 September 1907
Ship	State	Description
Olympia	United States	The steamer sprung a leak and was beached between Ashtabula, Ohio and Cleveland, Ohio. Refloated and drydocked at Cleveland.
Warren	United States	The 821-gross register ton screw steamer was stranded at Fall River, Massachusetts. The only person on board survived.

=== 10 September ===
List of shipwrecks: 10 September 1907
Ship	State	Description
Geo. G. Houghton	United States	The 332-gross register ton schooner sank north-northwest of Bar Point Light on the coast of Michigan. All four people on board survived.
H. A. Root	United States	The steamer capsized at Kenosha, Wisconsin, when a bin containing sand gave out, spilling the sand and causing a list that allowed the ship to fill, sinking in 15 feet of water. Two crewmen were killed. She was raised and taken to Milwaukee, Wisconsin, for repairs and was back in service by mid-November.
H. D. Moore	United States	The 143-gross register ton schooner was stranded in Lake Michigan on South Manitou Island, Michigan. All four people on board survived.
S. B. Paige	United States	The 47-gross register ton schooner sank in Sturgeon Bay on the coast of Wisconsin. Both people on board survived.

=== 12 September ===
List of shipwrecks: 12 September 1907
Ship	State	Description
Fannie S. Groverman	United States	The 13-gross register ton schooner was lost in the Elizabeth River in Virginia when she collided with the screw steamer Dorchester (United States). All three people on board survived.
Julia	United States	The schooner was sunk in a collision with the steam tug Islander (United States) off Manhattan Beach, Coney Island, New York. Islander rescued her crew.

=== 13 September ===
List of shipwrecks: 13 September 1907
Ship	State	Description
Carrsville	United States	With no one on board, the 11-gross register ton motor paddle vessel sank at Kansas City, Missouri.
Julia	United States	The 57-gross register ton schooner was lost in a collision with the screw steamer Islander (United States) off Coney Island in Queens, New York. All five people on board survived.

=== 15 September ===
List of shipwrecks: 15 September 1907
Ship	State	Description
Anemone	United States	The yacht burned in a boathouse at the foot of Ferry Street in Buffalo, New York.
Lillie Lockett	United States	With no one on board, the 6-gross register ton sloop sank in Watts Creek in Virginia.

=== 17 September ===
List of shipwrecks: 17 September 1907
Ship	State	Description
Susan	United States	The 198-gross register ton sternwheel paddle steamer was lost when she struck a snag in the Missouri River off Fort Calhoun, Nebraska. All 11 people on board survived.

=== 18 September ===
List of shipwrecks: 18 September 1907
Ship	State	Description
Dauntless	United States	The 50-gross register ton schooner was lost in a collision with the barge Arthur (United States) at Pinners Point in Portsmouth, Virginia. All five people on board survived.
Nautilus	United States	The schooner was sunk in a collision with the barge Harberson Hickman, under tow of Asher J. Hudson (United States), Norfolk, Virginia.

=== 19 September ===
List of shipwrecks: 19 September 1907
Ship	State	Description
Barge No. 3	United States	With no cargo or crew on board, the 383-gross register ton barge sank in a gale while at anchor in St. Michael Bay (63°27′N 162°00′W) on the west-central coast of the District of Alaska and became a total loss.
Jim T. Duffy	United States	The steamer struck a rock and sank at the foot of Big Bend Shoals in the Tennessee River.
Majestic	United States	The 1,985-gross register ton screw steamer burned to the waterline and sank in Lake Erie 12 nautical miles (22 km; 14 mi) west of Long Point, Ontario. The steamer Charlemagne Tower (United States) rescued her entire crew of 17.
Mary Catherine	United States	The 80-gross register ton motor yacht burned at Chicago, Illinois. All four people on board survived.

=== 20 September ===
List of shipwrecks: 20 September 1907
Ship	State	Description
Lafourche (or La Fourche)	United States	The 398-gross register ton sternwheel paddle steamer burned on the Mississippi River in Louisiana at Twelve Mile Point, 12 miles (19 km) above New Orleans. All 40 people on board survived, but she was declared a total loss.
Vine	United States	During a voyage from San Francisco, California, to the Bering Sea and Arctic Ocean with a cargo of 65 tons of general merchandise, the 226-ton, 107.9-foot (32.9 m) schooner dragged her anchors during a gale and was stranded on the beach at Deering, District of Alaska, becoming a total loss. Her crew survived, and half her cargo was saved.

=== 21 September ===
List of shipwrecks: 21 September 1907
Ship	State	Description
Alexander Nimick	United States	The 1,968-gross register ton screw steamer – a bulk carrier – sprung a leak in a violent gale and heavy seas off Vermilion Point on Lake Superior and was beached at Vermilion, Michigan, near the mouth of Two Hearted River to prevent her from sinking, but broke up. She was declared a total loss. Six officers and crewmen in one lifeboat were killed, the other one with 10 or 11 crewmen aboard made it to shore.
Grace W. Hone	United States	The 11-gross register ton schooner was stranded on Wooden Ball Island in Penobscot Bay off the coast of Maine. All five people on board survived.
Tellus	Norway	The steamer foundered on 22 September, or went ashore on the north spit at the entrance to Grays Harbor, Washington, on 21 September, breaking in half the next day, a total loss.
Vine	United States	The 228-gross register ton schooner was stranded at Deering, District of Alaska. All eight people on board survived.

=== 22 September ===
List of shipwrecks: 22 September 1907
Ship	State	Description
Principessa Jolanda	Italy	The new ocean liner capsized and sank at launch at C N R Shipyard, Riva Trigoso, Italy. Damaged beyond repair, her engines were salvaged and she was then scrapped.
Rambler	United States	The pleasure boat was sunk in a collision with Ed. F. Murray (United States) off Port Ewen, New York.

=== 23 September ===
List of shipwrecks: 23 September 1907
Ship	State	Description
Blanch	United States	The yacht blew up and sank at the foot of Gallipolis Island in the Ohio River. A lantern fell into the hold, probably detonating gas fumes. Three passengers were killed.
H. M. Carter	United States	The steamer struck a snag in the Red River of the South and sank.
Penekese	United States	The 23-gross register ton schooner was stranded at Welcher Point in Milford, Connecticut. Both people on board survived.

=== 24 September ===
List of shipwrecks: 24 September 1907
Ship	State	Description
Cumberland	United States	The 413-gross register ton schooner sank off Wolf Point, New Brunswick, Canada. All six people on board survived.
La Conner	United States	The 297-gross register ton screw steamer burned at either La Conner or Tacoma, Washington (sources disagree). All 14 people on board survived.

=== 27 September ===
List of shipwrecks: 27 September 1907
Ship	State	Description
Dial	United States	The 98-gross register ton screw steamer's keel struck a submerged piling as she docked at New Orleans, Louisiana, and she listed to the point that she filled with water and sank with the loss of one life. There were 29 survivors.

=== 29 September ===
List of shipwrecks: 29 September 1907
Ship	State	Description
Metamora	Canada	The wreck of Metamora on 27 August 2010 The tug struck a shallow shoal in Georgian Bay just west of Turning Island, near Pointe au Baril, Ontario, Canada, caught fire, and sank at 45°31′43.39″N 80°24′26.61″W. All aboard swam to safety.

=== 30 September ===
List of shipwrecks: 30 September 1907
Ship	State	Description
Antelope	United States	The 123-gross register ton schooner was stranded on the Nehalem River in northwestern Oregon. All four people on board survived.
Dragoon	United States	The 11-gross register ton motor vessel burned at Brunswick, Georgia. Both people on board survived.
Glen	United States	The 127-gross register ton, 106.6-foot (32.5 m) cod-fishing schooner was wrecked with the loss of one life at Ikitak in East Anchor Cove (54°41′30″N 163°04′00″W) on the coast of Unimak Island in the Aleutian Islands after her anchor cables parted during a gale. There were seven survivors.

== October ==
=== 1 October ===
List of shipwrecks: 1 October 1907
Ship	State	Description
Castleton	United States	The 412-gross register ton barge was lost in a collision with the sidewheel paddle steamer Rochester (United States) at New York City. The only person on board survived.
Raymond H.	United States	The 55-gross register ton sternwheel paddle steamer caught fire at Newston Georgia on the Flint River after leaving Jones Landing, and was abandoned by her crew. Two crewmen were killed, and she was declared a total loss. Her loss may have occurred on 2 October.

=== 2 October ===
List of shipwrecks: 2 October 1907
Ship	State	Description
Transfer No. 3	United States	The steam tug sank in the New York City area while assisting the steamer Bunker Hill (United States) when Bunker Hill's propeller slashed her hull.

=== 3 October ===
List of shipwrecks: 3 October 1907
Ship	State	Description
Addie Morrill	United States	The 654-gross register ton barkentine sank off Cape Hatteras, North Carolina. All nine people on board survived.
John W. Love	United States	The steamer sank in Lock No. 1 in the Cumberland River. Later raised.
Lassell	United States	The steamer ran aground on Virginia Shoal, Florida. Refloated on 5 October and beached five miles (8.0 km) from Cape Florida. Temporary repairs made and refloated again on 14 October and taken to Key West, Florida, after further repairs take to New Orleans.
Susan	United States	The steamer struck a snag in the Missouri River and sank near De Soto, Iowa. Total loss.

=== 4 October ===
List of shipwrecks: 4 October 1907
Ship	State	Description
Dixie	United States	The steamer burned and sank while tied to the bank at Lock No. 10 on the Kentucky River due to an exploding lamp. Total loss.

=== 5 October ===
List of shipwrecks: 5 October 1907
Ship	State	Description
Excelsior	United States	The steamer was sunk in a collision with Presque Isle (United States) in the Detroit River near Bois Blanc Island.
Martha W. Tuft	United States	The 173-ton, 105-foot (32.0 m) schooner was wrecked when a storm washed her onto a spit at the mouth of the Katalla River (60°12′N 144°31′W) on the south-central coast of the District of Alaska. Her crew of seven survived the storm by climbing into her rigging.
Volund	Norway	The freighter ran aground off Cape Blomidon. refloated and returned to service.

=== 6 October ===
List of shipwrecks: 6 October 1907
Ship	State	Description
Saint Paul	United States	During a voyage in the waters of the District of Alaska from Kodiak to Chowiet Island (56°02′N 156°42′W) in the Semidi Islands with a crew of nine and a cargo of merchandise, the 48-gross register ton, 63.5-foot (19.4 m) schooner was wrecked without loss of life in the Gulf of Alaska on the west side of Chowiet Island during a gale.
Success	United States	The steamer burned and sank at dock in Fort Myers, Florida. Hull raised and rebuilt.

=== 7 October ===
List of shipwrecks: 7 October 1907
Ship	State	Description
Roann	United States	The 39-gross register ton sternwheel paddle steamer sank in the Mississippi River at Young's Point, Louisiana. All four people on board survived.

=== 8 October ===
List of shipwrecks: 8 October 1907
Ship	State	Description
C. C. Algier	United States	The 19-gross register ton sloop was stranded at Bradford, Rhode Island. Both people on board survived.
City of Fulton	United States	The 67-gross register ton motor paddle vessel burned on the Red River of the South at Fulton, Arkansas. All seven people on board survived.
Grace Choate	United States	The 41-gross register ton schooner sank off Mount Desert, Maine. All 21 people on board survived.
Hattie	United States	The unmanned scow, under tow by the tug Nellie Tracy (United States), sank in a gale off Robin's Reef, in the harbor of New York City.
J. J. McCullum	United States	The scow, under tow by tug Nellie Tracy (United States), sank in a gale off Robin's Reef, in the harbor of New York City. The only crewman on board died.
Teutonic	United States	The 253-gross register ton barge, one of two barges under tow by the steamer Greenwich (United States), sank in a heavy storm in Long Island Sound off Greenwich, Connecticut. Her captain made it to the other barge, Pottsville (United States). The only other person aboard Teutonic – a woman – died.

=== 9 October ===
List of shipwrecks: 9 October 1907
Ship	State	Description
R. P. Chase	United States	The 102-gross register ton schooner was stranded on the Outer Black Rocks on the coast of Maine. All three people on board survived.
Walter Sands	United States	The barge was sunk in a collision with Dean Richmond (United States), probably at Albany, New York.
Warrenn	United States	The 98-gross register ton sternwheel paddle steamer either sank or was stranded (sources disagree) in a strong wind while tied to the bank of the Cumberland River at Burnside, Kentucky and was declared a total loss. The only person aboard survived.

=== 10 October ===
List of shipwrecks: 10 October 1907
Ship	State	Description
Volund	Norway	The ship ran aground at Cape Blomidon, Nova Scotia. She was on a voyage from Windsor, Nova Scotia, to New York City.

=== 11 October ===
List of shipwrecks: 11 October 1907
Ship	State	Description
Aagot	Norway	Aagot The three-masted square-rigged sailing ship was wrecked on Wardang Island in the Spencer Gulf off the western coast of the Yorke Peninsula, South Australia.
Cyprus	United States	The 4,900-gross register ton screw steamer – a bulk carrier and lake freighter – capsized due to cargo shift and sank on her maiden voyage, or second voyage, in a violent northwest gale with heavy seas on Lake Superior 18 nautical miles (33 km; 21 mi) north of Deer Park, Michigan. Eighteen crewmen went down with the ship. Three or four others (sources disagree on the number) abandoned ship on a life raft, but all but one of them died when breaking waves struck the raft on the shore near the Deer Park United States Life-Saving Service station. The second mate was the sole survivor.
Fred Pabst	United States	The 2,430-gross register ton screw steamer sank in a collision with the steamer Lake Shore (United States) in the St. Clair River on the United States-Canada border between Michigan and Ontario. Al 19 people on board survived, but she was declared a total loss.
Martha W. Tuft	United States	The 173-gross register ton schooner was stranded in the Kattala River in the District of Alaska. All seven people on board survived.

=== 12 October ===
List of shipwrecks: 12 October 1907
Ship	State	Description
J. S. Glover	United States	The 56-gross register ton schooner sank off Marsh Harbor, Maine. All three people on board survived.
Saxon	United States	The 555-gross register ton barge, under tow by the steamer Kathadin (United States), went ashore at Gull Island on the coast of North Carolina 15 miles (24 km) north of Hatteras after the tow line parted. Three of the four people on board lost their lives.
Twilight	United States	The 59-gross register ton schooner departed West Side, New Brunswick, bound for Eastport, Maine, with four people on board and was never heard from again.

=== 13 October ===
List of shipwrecks: 13 October 1907
Ship	State	Description
Pedro Nunes	Royal Portuguese Navy	The decommissioned training ship, a composite clipper ship, was sunk as a torpedo target in the Atlantic Ocean off Cascais, Portugal.
Seward	United States	The 29-gross register ton motor yacht burned at Port Norris, New Jersey. All five people on board survived.

=== 14 October ===
List of shipwrecks: 14 October 1907
Ship	State	Description
Wasp	United States	The 14-gross register ton schooner was stranded at West Dennis, Massachusetts. Both people on board survived.

=== 15 October ===
List of shipwrecks: 15 October 1907
Ship	State	Description
Carrie C. Miles	United States	The 106-gross register ton schooner was stranded on Dry Roamer Shoal on the coast of New York. All four people on board survived.
Frederick B. Wells	United States	While trying to dock at Ashtabula, Ohio, in a gale and strong current without the assistance of a tug, the steamer tried to stop her forward movement by reversing her engines and dropping an anchor but ran over the anchor, puncturing her bottom and causing her to sink. She was refloated by lightering her cargo and was drydocked.

=== 16 October ===
List of shipwrecks: 16 October 1907
Ship	State	Description
Annie Sargent	United States	The 66-gross register ton schooner was stranded at Bayville Creek on Long Island, New York. Both people on board survived.
Glad Tidings	United States	The 654-gross register ton schooner was stranded on Nassau Bar on the coast of Georgia. All eight people on board survived.
Iowa	United States	The motor vessel stranded on Chilkat Island in Lynn Canal, District of Alaska.
Rowann	United States	The steamer was struck by a heavy current and sank in the Mississippi River between Vicksburg and Greenville, Mississippi. She was declared a total loss.
Samuel J. Christian	United States	The 55-gross register ton steam screw tug burned in the Detroit River at Detroit, Michigan. All three people on board survived, but she was declared a total loss.

=== 17 October ===
List of shipwrecks: 17 October 1907
Ship	State	Description
Clipper	United States	The steamer rolled on her starboard side and sank at Alice Mines on the Monongahela River. Raised, repaired and returned to service.
Ina Mactavish	United Kingdom	The coaster was wrecked at Amble, Northumberland, England. Two people drowned.
Skoryy	Imperial Russian Navy Revolutionary	1905 Russian Revolution: The torpedo boat was run aground at Vladivostok after being shelled by Czarist warships and shore batteries. 10 crew killed including a sailor and a female Revolutionary who had taken co-command of the ship, 7 taken captive.
Susan Elizabeth	United Kingdom	The schooner was wrecked on Porthminster Beach, St Ives, Cornwall, England. Crew rescued by lifeboat. Remains dynamited two years later.

=== 19 October ===
List of shipwrecks: 19 October 1907
Ship	State	Description
Lorraine	United States	The 10-gross register ton sternwheel motor paddle vessel burned on the Mississippi River at Andalusia, Illinois. All three people on board survived.
No. K 10	United States	The scow, under tow by tow steamer Agnes (United States), sank in a collision with scows towed by tug Col. John F. Gaynor (United States) in the New York City area.

=== 21 October ===
List of shipwrecks: 21 October 1907
Ship	State	Description
Cutter No. 2	United States Navy	The cutter – a boat assigned to the receiving ship USS Franklin (United States Navy) – collided with a barge under tow by the tow steamer Pioneer (United States) at Norfolk, Virginia. Cutter No. 2 and a launch lashed to her starboard side capsized, and Cutter No. 2 sank. One occupant of the launch drowned.
Queen Cristina	United Kingdom	The 4,268 GRT steamer on a passage from San Francisco to Portland in ballast ran aground during heavy fog and was wrecked on North Seal Rock, off Crescent City.
Sceptre	United States	The 125-gross register ton schooner was stranded on Scatary Island in Nova Scotia, Canada. All 18 people on board survived.

=== 22 October ===
List of shipwrecks: 22 October 1907
Ship	State	Description
Defender	United States	The 17-gross register ton, 44-foot (13.4 m) schooner sank in Kuskokwim Bay off the coast of the District of Alaska. Sources differ on whether two or five people – two passengers and a crew of three – were on board, but agree that all on board survived.
Elsie Weatherby	United States	The cargo ship was tied up alongside another vessel in the Schuylkill River at Campbell's Wharf in Philadelphia, Pennsylvania, when she was caught on a ridge on the bottom of the river when the tide went out, causing her to list, fill with water, and sink. She later was raised.
H. F. Hallett	United States	The hulked 350-gross register ton barge, under the care of the steamer Harold (United States), foundered in Long Island Sound while anchored near Faulkners Island off Guilford, Connecticut, in a stiff breeze. Harold rescued her crew of two.
Prima Donna	United States	The hulked 210-gross register ton barge, under the care of the steamer Harold (United States), foundered in Long Island Sound while anchored near Faulkners Island off Guilford, Connecticut, in a stiff breeze. Harold rescued her crew of two.

=== 23 October ===
List of shipwrecks: 23 October 1907
Ship	State	Description
New York	United States	The 1,688-gross register ton schooner barge or scow barge, under tow by the steamer John Scully (United States), sprung a leak and sank in the Atlantic Ocean 15 miles (24 km) southwest of Montauk Point, Long Island, New York. John Scully rescued her crew of four.
Novelty	United States	The 592-gross register ton schooner was stranded on the coast of Oregon 14 miles (23 km) north of Cape Arago. All 10 people on board survived.

=== 26 October ===
List of shipwrecks: 26 October 1907
Ship	State	Description
Kittie H.	United States	The motor boat sank in a collision with the lighter S. B. Greacen (United States) in the Passaic River 150 feet (46 m) off the Plank Road Bridge.

=== 27 October ===
List of shipwrecks: 27 October 1907
Ship	State	Description
Anglo Saxon	United States	Operating under sail because of a line fouling her propeller, the 14-gross register ton motor vessel was wrecked on a reef 0.75 nautical miles (1.4 km; 0.9 mi) off the coast of the District of Alaska near Nome, approximately 7 nautical miles (13 km; 8.1 mi) southeast of Cape Wooley (64°43′N 166°30′W) during a voyage from Nome to Tin City. Sources disagree as to whether her crew of two was aboard and survived or no one was aboard at the time of her wreck.
Douglas	United States	The steamer lost the stuffing in the stuffing box of her stern pipe in Lake St. Clair resulting in her being beached at Windmill Point.
Racer	United States	The 68-gross register ton schooner sank off Bridgeport, Connecticut. Both people on board survived.

=== 28 October ===
List of shipwrecks: 28 October 1907
Ship	State	Description
Margretta	United States	The 18-gross register ton screw steamer burned while tied up at a dock in Grindstone City, Michigan. A pilot who was the only person on board died.
Spokane	United States	The 2,356-gross register ton iron-hulled screw steamer was stranded in Lake Superior on Gull Rock off Manitou Island in Michigan. All 18 people on board survived.
Valiant	United States	The tug sank at Pier 6 at the Bush Docks in Brooklyn, New York.

=== 29 October ===
List of shipwrecks: 29 October 1907
Ship	State	Description
Alfred	United States	The barge, under tow by Leader (United States), was sunk in a collision with the barge Alice, under tow by Meteor (United States), in the Delaware River near the Greenwich Coal Piers, Philadelphia.
R. G. Davis	United States	The tug foundered overnight at dock in a gale at Newburgh, New York.
William L. Walker	United States	The 592-gross register ton schooner sank in the Atlantic Ocean 40 nautical miles (74 km; 46 mi) south of Cape Lookout, North Carolina. All eight people on board survived.

=== 30 October ===
List of shipwrecks: 30 October 1907
Ship	State	Description
Cormorant	United States	The 977-gross register ton screw steamer burned to the waterline on Lake Superior off Basswood Island the Apostle Islands. All 15 people on board survived.
Foam	United States	The 64-gross register ton schooner sank in the Atlantic Ocean 11 nautical miles (20 km; 13 mi) east of Cape Henry, Virginia. All five people on board survived.
Rose Innes	United States	The 835-gross register ton barkentine was stranded on St. Simons Island on the coast of Georgia. All 10 people on board survived.

=== Unknown date ===
List of shipwrecks: Unknown date October 1907
Ship	State	Description
Dixie	United States	The 35-gross register ton sternwheel paddle steamer burned in Lock No. 10 on the Kentucky River in Kentucky. All eight people on board survived.

== November ==
=== 1 November ===
List of shipwrecks: 1 November 1907
Ship	State	Description
Bailey Gatzert	United States	The steamer struck Ough Reef off Washougal, Washington and was beached for emergency repairs.
Baltic	United Kingdom	The Thames barge ran onto St Clement's Isle, Mousehole en route to Newlyn with cement for the harbour works. Her crew were saved by Mousehole fishermen who were unimpressed with the non–appearance of the lifeboat stuck in the mud at Penzance. Baltic ended her days as a hulk in an Essex creek.
Eula	United States	The steamer was blown ashore in a gale and wrecked at Richardson, Washington. Total loss.
Monroe C. Smith	United States	The steamer was damaged in a collision with William E. Reis (United States) in the St. Clair River off Russells Island and beached on Russells Island. Later raised, repaired and returned to service.
William E. Reis	United States	The steamer was sunk in a collision with Monroe C. Smith (United States) in the St. Clair River off Russells Island in 26 feet (7.9 m) of water. Later raised, repaired and returned to service as Uranus.

=== 2 November ===
List of shipwrecks: 2 November 1907
Ship	State	Description
Myrtie	United States	The 25-gross register ton steam screw tug lost her tow line to a scow she was towing while entering the Niagara River on the United States-Canada border between New York and Ontario and as she attempted to recover the scow her wheel chains parted and she drifted onto Bird Island Reef. All four people on board survived. She broke up before she could be refloated, becoming a total loss.
William Voorhis	United States	The 89-gross register ton schooner was lost when she struck a dock at New York City. All four people on board survived.

=== 4 November ===
List of shipwrecks: 4 November 1907
Ship	State	Description
City of Birmingham	United States	The 3,066-gross register ton steel-hulled screw steamer struck an uncharted object and either sank or was wrecked (sources disagree) off Castle Island off the coast of Massachusetts while leaving Boston Harbor. All 34 people on board survived, but she was a total loss.

=== 5 November ===
List of shipwrecks: 5 November 1907
Ship	State	Description
Satsuma Maru	Japan	The sealing schooner was wrecked at Point Manby (59°41′30″N 140°18′15″W) on the south-central coast of the District of Alaska below the Malaspina Glacier after her anchor cable broke during a gale. All 20 of her crew survived. The captain and eight of his crewmen reached Yakutat safely; the other 11 crewmen remained at the wreck site until the revenue cutter USRC Thetis ( United States Revenue Cutter Service) rescued them in 1908.
Susan Stetson	United States	The 140-gross register ton schooner sank in the Gulf of Maine 50 nautical miles (93 km; 58 mi) southeast of Biddeford Pool, Maine. All five people on board survived.

=== 6 November ===
List of shipwrecks: 6 November 1907
Ship	State	Description
Creedmoor	United States	The steamer broke loose from its dock in a gale at Stonington, Maine, and was blown ashore and wrecked.
Jonathan Sawyer	United States	The 399-gross register ton schooner was stranded at Cape Porpoise, Maine. All seven people on board survived.
No. 8	United States	The barge, under tow of Norfolk (United States), went ashore after the tow line parted in the Chesapeake Bay below Old Plantation Flats Light near Cape Charles, Virginia.
Portland	United States	The dredge was sunk in a collision with Bailey Gatzert (United States) in the Willamette River off Willamette Slough.
Servia	United States	While anchored off Karluk, District of Alaska, on Kodiak Island and taking aboard a cargo of canned salmon, the 1,866-gross register ton, 234.1-foot (71.4 m) bark was driven ashore and wrecked at Julia Foard Point (57°34′10″N 154°27′30″W) when a gale struck and broke both her anchor chains. Three of her crew perished, but the other 17 swam to shore or were rescued by cannery tenders.
Velox	United States	The yacht, belonging to the New York City Fire Department, was damaged in a collision with Leonard J. Busby (United States). She was towed by Busby to the foot of Morris Street, Jersey City, New Jersey where she sank.
Wicomico	United States	The fishing steamer was wrecked on Assateague Island. Total loss.

=== 7 November ===
List of shipwrecks: 7 November 1907
Ship	State	Description
E Pluribus Unum	United States	The 21-gross register ton schooner was stranded on Seal Island off the coast of Maine. Both people on board survived.
Gertrude	United States	The 6-gross register ton sloop sank off Dennis, Massachusetts. Both people on board survived.

=== 9 November ===
List of shipwrecks: 9 November 1907
Ship	State	Description
Ann S. Deas	United States	The 34-gross register ton schooner was stranded on the North Edisto Bar on the coast of South Carolina. All four people on board survived.
Louisiana	United States	The steamer in a gale and snowstorm attempted to enter the Lake Superior Ship Canal but struck the south pier knocking a hole in the hull, sinking her. Later raised.
V. Swain	United States	The steamer, beached in Howard's Bay awaiting repair after sinking and being raised in 1903, burned to the waterline, a total loss.
Zouave	United States	The tow steamer struck a submerged object in the channel to Wilson Point, Connecticut, and was beached to prevent sinking. Later refloated and towed to drydock.

=== 10 November ===
List of shipwrecks: 10 November 1907
Ship	State	Description
Dr. W. J. Newbill	United States	The 94-gross register ton screw steamer burned in Carters Creek near Irvington, Virginia. All 37 people on board survived.
"John Shelly"	United Kingdom	The 175-ton schooner was sunk in a collision in dense fog by fish carrier "Speedwell" (United Kingdom) in the North Sea 12 miles off Lowestoft. All crew saved by Speedwell.

=== 11 November ===
List of shipwrecks: 11 November 1907
Ship	State	Description
Annie Rousel	United States	The 14-gross register ton motor vessel burned at Dungeness, Washington. Both people on board survived.
Rockliffe	United Kingdom	The 126.8-foot (38.6 m) trawler was wrecked in a Force 3 gale on rocks at Cairnbrock Shore, 2 miles south of Craig Laggan Beacon, Portobello Bay, The Rhins of Galloway. Machinery and equipment salvaged in 1908, attempts to refloat was frustrated by bad weather and she was abandoned, a Total Loss
Vagabondia	United States	The yacht sank at dock at Savannah, Georgia, when her hull was punctured by a submerged piling.

=== 14 November ===
List of shipwrecks: 14 November 1907
Ship	State	Description
Berkeley	United States	The 571-gross register ton screw steamer burned at sea in the Pacific Ocean off the coast of California 7 nautical miles (13 km; 8.1 mi) east of Point Conception. All 20 people on board survived, but she was declared a total loss.
Harriet Winnie (or Harriet E. Winne)	United States	The 386-gross register ton barge, under tow by the steamer Blue Bell (United States), lost her tow line northwest of the Cornfield Lightship during a gale. She drifted onto Plum Island off the coast of Long Island, New York, and broke up. The only person on board survived.

=== 15 November ===
List of shipwrecks: 15 November 1907
Ship	State	Description
Crystal or Chrystal	United States	The 28-gross register ton schooner was sunk in a collision with a barge under tow by the steam screw tug P. R. R. No. 32 (United States) in the Kill Van Kull off Constable Hook, New Jersey. All four people on board survived.
Emma K	United States	The 32-gross register ton screw steamer was stranded on the western shore of the Chesapeake Bay off Back River Light on the coast of Virginia. All five people on board survived.

=== 16 November ===
List of shipwrecks: 16 November 1907
Ship	State	Description
Ella Rose	United States	The 59-gross register ton schooner was stranded on Sheep Island Ledge near Vinalhaven, Maine. Both people on board survived.

=== 17 November ===
List of shipwrecks: 17 November 1907
Ship	State	Description
Phoebe Ann	United States	The 32-gross register ton schooner was lost when she struck a pier on the East River in New York City. All four people on board survived.

=== 18 November ===
List of shipwrecks: 18 November 1907
Ship	State	Description
Ravenswood	United States	The 31-gross register ton motor yacht burned off College Point, Queens, New York. All eight people on board survived.

=== 20 November ===
List of shipwrecks: 20 November 1907
Ship	State	Description
Ruth	United States	The steamer struck a stump in the Willamette River at McCann's Farm and sank in 20 feet (6.1 m) of water.

=== 22 November ===
List of shipwrecks: 22 November 1907
Ship	State	Description
Eureka	United States	The 6-gross register ton sloop was stranded at Springs, Long Island, New York. Both people on board survived.
Jane	United Kingdom	The ketch was wrecked in Pwll Du Bay on the Gower Peninsula in Wales. Her crew of two survived.
Lizzie Madden	United States	The 690-gross register ton screw steamer – a bulk carrier – caught fire on Lake Huron off Tawas City, Michigan. Her entire crew of 13 abandoned ship, was rescued by the steamer Langell Boys, and survived. She drifted ashore on Little Charity Island in Saginaw Bay. Her engine and boiler were salvaged.

=== 23 November ===
List of shipwrecks: 23 November 1907
Ship	State	Description
Escort	United States	The tug was sunk in a collision with the barge Ben Harrison near Port Dalhousie, Ontario. Three lives lost.
Lucy E.	United States	The 26-gross register ton schooner was stranded at Plymouth, Massachusetts. All 10 people on board survived.
Monohansett	United States	The propeller of Monohansett Carrying a cargo of coal, the 572-gross register ton wooden steam screw barge caught fire, burned to the waterline, and sank in 18 feet (5.5 m) of water in Lake Huron off the coast of Michigan south of Thunder Bay Island at 45.033267°N 83.1998°W. Personnel from the nearby United States Life-Saving Service station on Thunder Bay Island rescued all 12 people on board.

=== 24 November ===
List of shipwrecks: 24 November 1907
Ship	State	Description
Bangalore	United States	During a voyage from Norfolk, Virginia, to Honolulu, Territory of Hawaii, with 21 people on board, the 1,743-gross register ton iron-hulled full-rigged ship spoke with the vessel Bangalore (flag unknown) in the Atlantic Ocean at 07°N 026°W and was never heard from again.
C. H. Malleson	United States	The 48-gross register ton schooner was stranded at Glen Cove, New York. All three people on board survived.
F. B. Jones	United States	The steamer was sunk in a collision with the steamer Ascunsion (United States) in the Columbia River on the Oregon-Washington border near Slaughter's Light.
Grace Collins	United States	The 24-gross register ton sloop sank in the Mispillion River in Delaware, with the loss of both people on board.
Mary Isabel	United States	The 65-gross register ton schooner sank off Reed Creek Point, Long Island, New York. All five people on board survived.
Refuge	United States	The 14-gross register ton schooner sank off Swan Point on Cedar Island on the coast of North Carolina. The only person on board perished.
Thistle	United States	The 12-gross register ton motor vessel burned on Pine Lake in Michigan. All nine people on board survived.
Two Brothers	United States	The steamer sprung a leak and sank in 6 feet (1.8 m) of water in the Ohio River near New Martinsville, West Virginia.

=== 25 November ===
List of shipwrecks: 25 November 1907
Ship	State	Description
Number Twenty-Six	United States	The 1,566-gross register ton iron-hulled schooner barge or scow barge sank off Barnegat, New Jersey. All six people on board survived.

=== 27 November ===
List of shipwrecks: 27 November 1907
Ship	State	Description
Josephine Dresden	United States	The 84-gross register ton motor vessel was stranded on North Manitou Island in Lake Michigan off the coast of Michigan. All four people on board survived.
Verona	United States	After catching fire on the Hudson River near Highland Falls, New York, the 149-gross register ton passenger screw steamer was run ashore and burned out. All five people on board survived, but she was declared a total loss.

=== 28 November ===
List of shipwrecks: 28 November 1907
Ship	State	Description
Alfa	United States	The 5-ton, 30.2-foot (9.2 m) sloop was wrecked at Ugashik, District of Alaska. Both people on board survived.
Alta	United States	The 5.5-ton sloop was forced ashore by ice at Smoky Point in the entrance to Ugashik Bay on the Bristol Bay coast of the District of Alaska. During the night of 28–29 November, ice crushed her cabin and pushed her farther up on the beach, and by the spring of 1908 she had been completely destroyed.
Kanawha	United States	The laid-up 128-gross register ton composite-hulled steam yacht caught fire at her dock in Brunswick. Maine, near the Gurnet Bridge in Gurnet Bay off Casco Bay. All six people on board survived, but she burned out and was declared a total loss.
Number 26	United States	The barge foundered at anchor in a heavy gale on the Atlantic Ocean coast 26 miles (42 km) off Absecon Lighthouse (39°18′N 73°52′W).

=== 29 November ===
List of shipwrecks: 29 November 1907
Ship	State	Description
Havilah	United States	The 533-gross register ton brig was stranded at Point Garnas on the coast of Puerto Rico. All eight people on board survived.

=== 30 November ===
List of shipwrecks: 30 November 1907
Ship	State	Description
Leonora	United States	The 27-gross register ton schooner sank off Beaufort, South Carolina. All three people on board survived.

=== Unknown date ===
List of shipwrecks: Unknown November 1907
Ship	State	Description
Bangalore	United States	The ship sailed from Norfolk, Virginia, on 23 October to Honolulu, Hawaii, with 2,600 tons of coal consigned for the United States Navy. On 24 November 1907, she was reported at 7°N 26°W, several hundred miles east of her normal route. This was her last reported sighting. One theory for her disappearance has her rounding Cape of Good Hope rather than Cape Horn and ultimately shipwrecked on Middleton Reef, Australia. Captain Lewis S. Colley was in command of Bangalore when she disappeared, this being his first command of the ship and a last minute replacement for Captain Phineas Banning Blanchard.
Hellena	United States	The 15-gross register ton sternwheel motor paddle vessel was lost when she struck a snag in the Missouri River at Albaton, Iowa. The only person on board survived.
Wm. A Steelman	United States	The 17-gross register ton schooner was lost when she struck a dock at Tilghman Island in Maryland. Both people on board survived.

== December ==
=== 1 December ===
List of shipwrecks: 1 December 1907
Ship	State	Description
Columbia	United States	The steamer sank at Terminal Dock, Miami, Florida. Later raised.

=== 2 December ===
List of shipwrecks: 2 December 1907
Ship	State	Description
Cyclone	United States	With no one on board, the laid-up 138-gross register ton sternwheel paddle steamer was destroyed at Wabasha, Minnesota, by a fire that spread to her from the sternwheel paddle steamer Isaac Staples (United States). She was declared a total loss.
Golden Gate	United States	The 13-gross register ton sloop was lost in a collision with the screw steamer Watuppa (United States) in Raritan Bay on the coast of New Jersey. Both people on board survived.
Isaac Staples	United States	With no one on board, the laid-up 138-gross register ton sternwheel paddle steamer, on the ways for the winter, was destroyed by fire at Wabasha, Minnesota. She was declared a total loss.
J. W. Van Sant	United States	The laid-up 228-gross register ton sternwheel paddle steamer was destroyed at Wabasha, Minnesota, by a fire that spread to her from the sternwheel paddle steamer Isaac Staples (United States). All 24 people on board survived, but she was declared a total loss.
Mount Temple	United Kingdom	Mount Temple The cargo liner ran aground on West Ironbound Island, Nova Scotia, Canada. All on board survived. She was refloated on 15 April 1908, repaired and returned to service.

=== 3 December ===
List of shipwrecks: 3 December 1907
Ship	State	Description
City of Glasgow	United States	The 2,400-gross register ton screw steamer burned three miles (4.8 km) off Green Bay, Wisconsin. All 18 people on board survived.
Fortuna	United States	The 25-gross register ton schooner sank on Trundy Reef off the coast of Maine. Both people on board survived.
Shamrock	United States	The 23-gross register ton screw steamer burned on Flat Lake in Louisiana. All five people on board survived.

=== 4 December ===
List of shipwrecks: 4 December 1907
Ship	State	Description
C. H. Evans	United States	The 57-gross register ton screw steamer burned while tied up at a dock on the Satilla River at Bull Head Bluff, Georgia. All seven people on board survived.
Lee H. Brooks	United States	While tied up for the night on the Allegheny River at Aspinwall, Pennsylvania, the steamer sprang a leak, listed to starboard, and sank. She was raised, repaired, and returned to service.
Rebecca Shepherd	United States	The 411-gross register ton schooner was stranded on Pollock Rip Shoal off the coast of Massachusetts. All seven people on board survived.

=== 5 December ===
List of shipwrecks: 5 December 1907
Ship	State	Description
Gardiner B. Reynolds	United States	The 397-gross register ton schooner sank. All seven people on board survived.
Harland W. Huston	United States	The schooner was sunk in a collision with Pawnee (United States) in the Delaware River just below Horseshoe Buoy No. 37.
St. Marys	United States	The 688-gross register ton sidewheel paddle steamer ran aground on a bar in the Patuxent River off Holland Point at Benedict, Maryland, and then burned. One crewman was killed; the other eight people on board survived.

=== 6 December ===
List of shipwrecks: 6 December 1907
Ship	State	Description
Becquet	France	The 200-ton ship was lost in the Chausey Islands.
Desmond	United States	The steamer was sunk when she struck a dock in the St. Clair River off Russells Island while trying to avoid the wreck of William E. Reis (United States).
Sea Witch	United States	The 1,289-gross register ton, 197-foot (60 m) bark became waterlogged and was abandoned by her 16-member crew in the North Pacific Ocean west of Oregon at 45°41′N 127°30′W.
Thomas A. Ward	United States	The 805-gross register ton schooner burned in the Atlantic Ocean off the Southeastern United States at 32°05′N 077°48′W. All nine people on board survived.

=== 7 December ===
List of shipwrecks: 7 December 1907
Ship	State	Description
Kathryn	United States	The 67-gross register ton sternwheel paddle steamer burned at Pittsburgh, Pennsylvania. All seven people on board survived.
Sotoyome (or Sotoyomo)	United States	The 534-gross register ton motor vessel burned in the Pacific Ocean 14 nautical miles (26 km; 16 mi) southwest of Cape Mendocino on the coast of California. All 17 people on board survived, but she was a total loss.

=== 8 December ===
List of shipwrecks: 8 December 1907
Ship	State	Description
Katheryn	United States	The steamer caught fire on the Ohio River opposite Lower Allegheny, Pennsylvania, and was beached on Brunot Island, where she was destroyed. She was declared a total loss.
Victoria	United States	The 7-gross register ton motor vessel was stranded at Huntington Beach, California. All three people on board survived.

=== 9 December ===
List of shipwrecks: 9 December 1907
Ship	State	Description
Alaskan	United States	The steamer was blown ashore in a gale and rain near Shelter Point, British Columbia. Refloated on 20 December.
Alice Wakeley	United States	The freighter sank at dock at Millville, New Jersey, when she grounded, filled and sank from a stressed hull. Raised the same day.

=== 12 December ===
List of shipwrecks: 12 December 1907
Ship	State	Description
E. G. Irwin	United States	The 188-gross register ton schooner was damaged in a collision with the tug Dauntless (United States) in the Chesapeake Bay off Point No Point, Maryland. Dauntless towed E. G. Irwin into shoal waters off Point Lookout, Maryland, where E. G. Irwin sank. All five people aboard E. G. Irwin survived, but one member of Dauntless's crew was killed.
Hercules	United States	The 108-foot (33 m), 150-gross register ton tug struck a reef during a storm and headed for the coast of Rhode Island to beach herself. She sank without loss of life in 15 feet (4.6 m) of water 100 yards (91 m) off Misquamicut Beach, Rhode Island, at 41°19.30′N 071°47.46′W.

=== 13 December ===
List of shipwrecks: 13 December 1907
Ship	State	Description
Alice	United States	The 25-gross register ton screw steamer was lost when she struck a pile at Pensacola, Florida. Both people on board survived.
Fawn	United States	The 11-gross register ton schooner was stranded on St. Rose Island, Florida. All five people on board survived.
No. 2	United States	The 403-gross register ton dredge sank in Lake Erie off Sandusky, Ohio, with the loss of one life. There were eight survivors.

=== 14 December ===
List of shipwrecks: 14 December 1907
Ship	State	Description
A. A. Sumner	United States	The barge, under tow by Hercules (United States), lost its tow when Hercules struck submerged wreckage in Block Island Sound and suffered a punctured hull. She drifted ashore at Pleasant View, Rhode Island, and broke up.
Alanson A. Sumner	United States	The 249-gross register ton barge was stranded at Watch Hill, Rhode Island. All three people on board survived.
Edmund Phinney	United States	The 751-gross register ton bark was stranded at Sandy Hook on the coast of New Jersey in a gale. All 10 people on board survived. Her wreck sank 400 yards (366 m) offshore in 25 feet (8 m) of water.
Elheurah	United States	The barge, under tow by Elmer A. Keeler (United States), lost its tow when the tow lines parted in a gale and she drifted ashore on the Norwalk Islands.
Elk	United States	The 299-gross register ton barge, under tow by the steamer Hercules (United States), lost her tow line when Hercules struck submerged wreckage in Block Island Sound and suffered a punctured hull. Elk drifted ashore at either Pleasant View or Watch Hill, Rhode Island (sources disagree), and broke up. The only person aboard Elk survived.
Ettie Moore	United States	The barge, under tow by Elmer A. Keeler (United States), lost its tow when the tow lines parted in a gale and she sank off the Norwalk Islands. Her crew was rescued by the tug D. S. Arnott (United States).
Hercules	United States	The 155-gross register ton steam screw tug struck submerged wreckage in Block Island Sound and suffered a punctured hull. She was beached at either Pleasant View or Watch Hill, Rhode Island, and sank. All 10 people on board survived, but she was declared a total loss.
James E. English	United States	The 285-gross register ton barge, under tow by the steam tug Hercules (United States), lost her tow when Hercules struck submerged wreckage in Block Island Sound and suffered a punctured hull. She drifted ashore at either Pleasant View or Watch Hill, Rhode Island (sources disagree), and broke up. Both people on board survived.
John C. Wyman	United States	The 268-gross register ton barge, under tow by the steam tug Hercules (United States), lost her tow when Hercules struck submerged wreckage in Block Island Sound and suffered a punctured hull. She drifted ashore at Pleasant View or Watch Hill, Rhode Island (sources disagree), and broke up. The only person on board survived.
James Parker, sr.	United States	The 116-gross register ton schooner was stranded at Callenders Point, Connecticut. All four people on board survived.
Maude	United States	The 20-gross register ton screw steamer burned in Louisiana either at New Orleans or on Bayou Plaquemine Brule while supplying steam to a pump on a dredge.
Shamrock	United States	The steamer burned at New Orleans, Louisiana. She was declared a total loss.
Thomas W. Lawson	United States	The 5,218-gross register ton seven-masted steel-hulled schooner was wrecked on Hellweather's Reef in the Scilly Isles during a storm with a loss of 17 lives. Her Captain and Engineer survived.

=== 15 December ===
List of shipwrecks: 15 December 1907
Ship	State	Description
Addie Jordan	United States	The 376-gross register ton barge was stranded at Manasquan, New Jersey. Both people on board survived.
Fox	United States	The tug caught fire in the Napa River in California and was scuttled in 15 feet (4.6 m) of water to extinguish the fire. She later was raised and repaired.
Nimbus	United States	The 884-gross register ton schooner sank in the Atlantic Ocean off the Southeastern United States at 33°15′N 074°50′W. All eight people on board survived.

=== 16 December ===
List of shipwrecks: 16 December 1907
Ship	State	Description
Alcaea	United States	The 403-gross register ton brigantine departed Philadelphia, Pennsylvania, bound for Martinique with seven people on board and was never heard from again.
M. G. Starrett	United States	The coal boat was sunk in a collision with a barge being towed by the tug S. O. Co. No. 8 (United States) off Eleventh Street in the East River.
Worms	Germany	The cargo vessel was wrecked off Craster, England.

=== 17 December ===
List of shipwrecks: 17 December 1907
Ship	State	Description
Jessie Barlow	United States	The 276-gross register ton schooner sank after colliding with the steam screw tug Lehigh (United States) near Pollock Rip Shoal off the coast of Massachusetts. All six people on board survived.
Spring Garden	United States	The tug anchored in seven feet (2.1 m) of water in the Elk River near Elkton, Maryland, when she was punctured and sunk by her own anchor. Raised and repaired.

=== 18 December ===
List of shipwrecks: 18 December 1907
Ship	State	Description
Tom Dowling	United States	The tug, while breaking ice near Washburn, Wisconsin, suffered a holed hull and sank in 14 feet (4.3 m) of water.

=== 20 December ===
List of shipwrecks: 20 December 1907
Ship	State	Description
David Currie	United States	The 151-gross register ton schooner sank off Duck Island, Connecticut. All four people on board survived.

=== 21 December ===
List of shipwrecks: 21 December 1907
Ship	State	Description
Cap Lopez	Belgium	The cargo ship ran aground on the Goodwin Sands, in the English Channel. Her crew were rescued.

=== 22 December ===
List of shipwrecks: 22 December 1907
Ship	State	Description
Charles H. Daiger	United States	The schooner was sunk in a collision with Lackawanna (United States) in the Potomac River two miles (3.2 km) north of Alexandria, Virginia.

=== 23 December ===
List of shipwrecks: 23 December 1907
Ship	State	Description
Ellis P. Rogers	United States	The 68-gross register ton barge was lost in the North River at New York City when mooring posts on a pier the ocean liner Mauretania (United Kingdom) was tied to give way in high winds while Ellis P. Rogers was lying alongside Mauretania to take off ashes from her. Mauretania went partially adrift and her bow struck Ellis P. Rogers. The only person aboard Ellis P. Rogers survived.
New Haven	United States	The barge, under tow by the steamer James McWilliams (United States), sank in a sudden and heavy gale in Long Island Sound off Merwins Point, Connecticut. Her captain and his wife drowned trying to board a lifeboat.
No. 128	United States	The barge was sunk at dock when struck in fog by the steamer General Joseph E. Johnston (United States) in the East River off 13th Street in New York City when General Joseph E. Johnston tried to tie up and wait out the fog.
Sky Blue	United States	The barge, under tow by James McWilliams (United States), sank in a sudden and heavy gale in Long Island Sound off Merwins Point, Connecticut.
Unidentified barges	United States	Five unidentified barges, under tow by the steamer James McWilliams (United States), sank in a sudden and heavy gale in Long Island Sound off Merwins Point, Connecticut.

=== 24 December ===
List of shipwrecks: 24 December 1907
Ship	State	Description
Frank R. Hill	United States	The 109-gross register ton sternwheel paddle steamer sank at New Orleans, Louisiana. The only person on board survived.

=== 25 December ===
List of shipwrecks: 25 December 1907
Ship	State	Description
George R. Bailey	United States	The motor boat struck a sunken barge in Napa Creek, Napa, California and sank. Both were later raised.

=== 26 December ===
List of shipwrecks: 26 December 1907
Ship	State	Description
Crane	United Kingdom	The 118.2-foot (36.0 m) trawler was lost at Tobermorey, Mull.

=== 27 December ===
List of shipwrecks: 27 December 1907
Ship	State	Description
Dei Gratia	Canada	The brigantine was wrecked on Black Rock, Dale, Pembrokeshire, England, after breaking her moorings in a storm.
Estelle Phinney	United States	The 922-gross register ton schooner sank in 80 feet (24 m) of water in the North Atlantic Ocean when she collided with the five-masted schooner Elizabeth Palmer (United States) off Barnegat, New Jersey. One person aboard Estelle Phinney died. There were nine survivors.

=== 29 December ===
List of shipwrecks: 29 December 1907
Ship	State	Description
J. B. Griffith	United States	The 15-gross register ton sternwheel paddle steamer burned in Little Pigeon Bayou in Louisiana. All four people on board survived, but she was declared a total loss.
Southern	United States	The 8-gross register ton motor vessel burned at Clinton, Texas. All five people on board survived.

=== 30 December ===
List of shipwrecks: 30 December 1907
Ship	State	Description
Agnes V. Gleason	United States	The 70-gross register ton schooner was stranded at Boothbay, Maine. All 14 people on board survived.
Annie Comings	United States	The 452-gross register ton sternwheel paddle steamer was lost in a collision with the bark Europe (France) on the Willamette River in Oregon. Her machinery and boiler, as well as her cargo of machinery, were salvaged. All 20 people on board survived.
Ida	United States	The 385-gross register ton barge sank in a strong storm off Point Judith, Rhode Island. Both people on board survived.
Jennie	United States	The 382-gross register ton barge was stranded in a strong storm at Point Judith, Rhode Island. Both people on board survived.

=== 31 December ===
List of shipwrecks: 31 December 1907
Ship	State	Description
Mavourneen	United States	The 13-gross register ton motor vessel was stranded on Fire Island on the coast of Long Island, New York. Both people on board survived.

== Unknown date ==
List of shipwrecks: Unknown date 1907
Ship	State	Description
Athene	Argentina	The 57 GRT steam yacht sailed from Greenock on 24 April 1907 for Madeira and Buenos Aires with a crew of eleven, but was not seen again. A small boat marked Athene came ashore, damaged, on 12 May at Eggerness Point, Garlieston, Wigtownshire. On 31 July, Lloyd's of London declared the vessel missing.
Bender Brothers	United States	The 80-net register ton, 77.5-foot (23.6 m) schooner was wrecked on the coast of the District of Alaska. According to the wreck report, the schooner was stranded during a gale sometime in 1907 on the beach in Kuskokwim Bay on the west-central coast and was abandoned there because of the onset of the winter of 1907–1908, but another source places it on 25 October 1907 at Unalaska on Unalaska Island in the Aleutian Islands. She reportedly was deemed a total loss, but may have been salvaged and returned to service until destroyed by a fire in December 1913.
Billow	United States	The United States Department of Commerce and Labor publication Thirty-Ninth Annual List of Merchant Vessels of the United States for the Year Ending 30 June 1907, reported that the 31-gross register ton schooner was stranded on Crotch Island in Casco Bay on the coast of Maine on an unidentified date. Both people on board survived.
Chilkat	United States	The vessel was listed as a total loss in Chilkoot Inlet in Southeast Alaska.
Coronel	Norway	Ran aground at Foreness Point, Broadstairs, Kent, United Kingdom. Later refloated and returned to service.
Ella Rohlffs	United States	The steamer was reported lost in San Alberto Bay (55°28′N 133°14′W) in Southeast Alaska near Craig, District of Alaska.
Evening Star	United States	The United States Department of Commerce and Labor publication Thirty-Ninth Annual List of Merchant Vessels of the United States for the Year Ending 30 June 1907, reported that the 8-gross register ton schooner was stranded at an unidentified location on an unidentified date. All four people on board survived.
Ivan Vassili	Russia	In the previous years, the freighter Ivan Vassili was alleged to have suffered attacks by a demon that caused crew to kill each other and themselves. By 1907, no one would crew the ship. In the winter, some sailors set her afire off the docks of Vladivostok. As the ship finally sank after a night burning, several eyewitnesses recounted hearing a disembodied scream come from the ship. The story seems to have been reported first in an article of the The Minneapolis Star on 14 April 1940 and appears to be false.
Luise Horn	Germany	The cargo vessel disappeared in the North Sea sometime in 1907.
Magallanes	Chile	The steamship sank off Corral.
Odiak	United States	The motor launch was wrecked at Bear Cape (60°12′N 146°43′W) in Prince William Sound on the south-central coast of the District of Alaska.
Rosedale	United Kingdom	The steam trawler was wrecked at Londonderry, United Kingdom sometime in 1907.
Ruby	Norway	The sailing ship ran aground off Fernandina, Florida and damaged beyond repair.
Seostris	Germany	The steamer was driven ashore on 4 March or 15 September during a storm at Ocos, Guatemala, and abandoned. Refloated on 27 March 1917 and taken to Victoria, British Columbia, for repairs. Put in service as Frances L. Skinner (United States).
