= SS Lucifer =

British steam ship that sank in 1907

Coordinates: 40°19′N 60°00′W

History

United Kingdom
- Name: Lucifer
- Namesake: Lucifer
- Owner: C.T. Bowring & Co
- Operator: Bearcreek Oil & Shipping Co
- Builder: C.S. Swan & Hunter, Wallsend
- Cost: £54,000
- Yard number: 246
- Launched: 10 August 1899
- Sponsored by: Miss M.C. Bowring
- Commissioned: 16 September 1899
- Home port: Liverpool
- Identification: UK Official Number 110609; Call sign RHTQ
- Fate: Foundered, 16 April 1907

General characteristics
- Type: Tanker
- Tonnage: 3,823 GRT; 2,473 NRT; 5,000 DWT
- Length: 344 ft 4 in (104.95 m)
- Beam: 47 ft 1 in (14.35 m)
- Depth: 20 ft 9 in (6.32 m)
- Installed power: 310 Nhp
- Propulsion: T Richardson & Sons 3-cylinder triple expansion
- Speed: 10.0 knots (11.5 mph; 18.5 km/h)

Lucifer was a steam tanker built in 1899 by the C.S. Swan & Hunter Co of Wallsend for C.T. Bowring & Co of Liverpool. The ship was designed and built to carry oil and petroleum cargo in bulk and spent most of her career trading on routes from Philadelphia, Batoum and Novorossiysk to Hamburg and British ports.

== Design and construction ==
The vessel was laid down at C.S. Swan & Hunter Co. shipyard in Wallsend and launched on 10 August 1899 (yard number 246), with Miss M.C. Bowring of Liverpool being the sponsor.

After completion of sea trials on 16 September, during which the ship attained maximum speed of 11.0 knots (12.7 mph; 20.4 km/h) and made a mean speed of 10.0 knots (11.5 mph; 18.5 km/h) over a measured mile, she was transferred to her owners and immediately departed for Philadelphia.

As built, the ship was 344 feet 4 inches (104.95 m) long (between perpendiculars) and 47 feet 1 inch (14.35 m) abeam, a mean draft of 20 feet 9 inches (6.32 m). Lucifer was assessed at 3,823 GRT and 2,473 NRT and had deadweight of approximately 5,000. The vessel had a steel hull, and a single 310 nhp triple-expansion steam engine, with cylinders of 24-inch (61 cm), 39-inch (99 cm) and 66-inch (170 cm) diameter with a 45-inch (110 cm) stroke, that drove a single screw propeller, and moved the ship at up to 10.0 knots (11.5 mph; 18.5 km/h).

== Operational history ==
Upon delivery Lucifer departed from South Shields for Philadelphia in ballast on 16 September 1899 and arrived at her destination on 2 October. After spending two days in port she left Philadelphia on 5 October and reached Cuxhaven on 26 October. The vessel left there on 31 October and arrived at Newcastle the next day, thus completing her maiden voyage.

The vessel immediately departed for her second voyage from Newcastle and arrived at Batoum on 21 November. After loading her cargo of oil, she sailed back two days later and arrived at Hamburg on 13 December. The vessel continued sailing between Hamburg and English ports and Batoum and Novorossiysk until the end of May 1900. For example, she arrived at Novorossiysk on 17 March 1900, loaded 221,103 poods (967,840 gallons) of refined illuminating oil, left on 21 March and arrived at Cardiff on 17 April. During her next trip she anchored at Batoum on 5 May, loaded 317,605 poods of kerosene, left on 7 May and arrived at Hamburg at the end of May. She then left Hamburg on 1 June and reached Baltimore on 21 June. There she loaded 1,750,464 gallons of petroleum and left on 23 June for Antwerp. She continued sailing between United States ports of Baltimore, New York and Philadelphia and Europe until the end of 1901. On 26 January 1901 she arrived at Antwerp with a lifeboat smashed and several deck fittings damaged due to rough weather the ship encountered on her trip.

In 1902 the tanker continued her oil trade between Philadelphia and United Kingdom and Europe but also made a couple of trips to Russia. For example, during her June trip to Batoum she brought back 320,366 poods (1,409,600 gallons) of kerosene to Bristol and Cardiff on 2 July 1902. Lucifer also returned to Manchester with 5,306 tons of kerosene on 1 January 1903, following her December trip to Novorossisk.

Following that trip Lucifer was briefly laid up until March 1903 when she resumed her trade. The vessel spent 1903 transporting oil and petroleum products from both Russia and Philadelphia. The ship spent 1904 carrying petroleum products exclusively from Russian Black Sea ports. For example, she brought in 1,006,400 gallons of lamp oil from Novorossisk to Cardiff on 22 December 1904. During the same trip she also had her hull plates bent, possibly through collision.

From 1905, for the rest of her career, Lucifer continued her service on the United States to Europe route. In addition to British and northern European ports, she started occasionally carrying her cargo to ports in Italy. During her November 1905 trip from Philadelphia to Rouen she lost three blades of her propeller and had to call at Portland for repairs. In 1906, for example, she delivered from Philadelphia 1,418,310 gallons of kerosene on 24 August and 1,419,550 gallons on 11 October for consignment of The Bowring Petroleum Co.

=== Sinking ===
Lucifer arrived at New York at 01:00 on 26 March 1907 from Manchester in ballast to load another cargo of kerosene for delivery to the United Kingdom. After loading approximately 25,000 barrels of oil, the ship departed from New York on 5 April and took course to Dublin and Belfast. The tanker was under command of captain Wilson and had a crew of 34 men. On 8 April a leak was discovered in stokehold and the pumps were employed, but the water kept rising until it reached the fires extinguishing them. The vessel continued drifting while the captain ordered to stock all lifeboats with provision good for about 12 days and made them ready for immediate use. The weather was rough with wind and heavy seas which exacerbated the situation. About three days later, the lights of two passing ships were spotted and distress calls were made but they apparently were not noticed. Some of the oil cargo was pumped out to lighten the ship and keep her afloat. Finally, on the night of 15 April, another steamer, SS Sagami, was sighted and this time she noticed the flares and rockets fired by the troubled tanker and came by to enquire. As the gale was still in full force, the rescue was postponed until the daylight. At about 03:30 the next morning the rescue operation started, continued for almost five hours. About an hour after captain Wilson, who was the last person to leave the doomed ship, boarded Sagami, Lucifer foundered. All 35 men from Lucifer were safely landed at Falmouth on 28 April. The Dutch steamer SS Ryndam which arrived at Rotterdam a few days earlier, claimed to have spoken to Lucifer on 12 April but was informed that while her stokehold was filled with water and pump was out of order, the tanker did not require assistance.
