= SS Izaro =

Spanish steamship

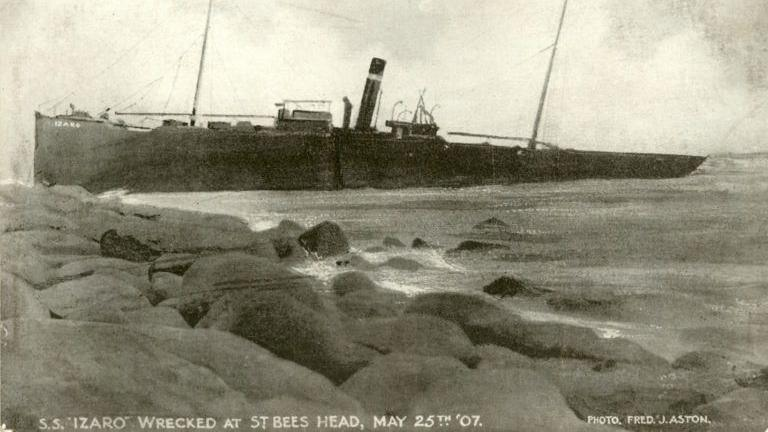

History

Spain
- Name: SS Izaro
- Fate: Wrecked 20 May 1907

SS Izaro was a Spanish steamship that had been wrecked in 1907.

== History ==
Izaro was originally named the Edith, built in 1890, at the Grangemouth Dockyard.

She was on her way to Maryport, Cumbria, England, with a cargo of iron ore when she ran aground on Tomlin Rocks at St Bees, Cumbria, on 20 May 1907. The crew scrambled to safety, but the ship was stuck fast, with bow and stern on the rocks, but her midships unsupported. The weight of her cargo caused her to split in two. The cargo was salvaged, but the ship was a total loss. As much of the ship's ironwork as possible was salvaged, and the remainder was dragged out to sea. The remains of her boilers and keel can still be seen. Large portions are visible if a particularly low tide.

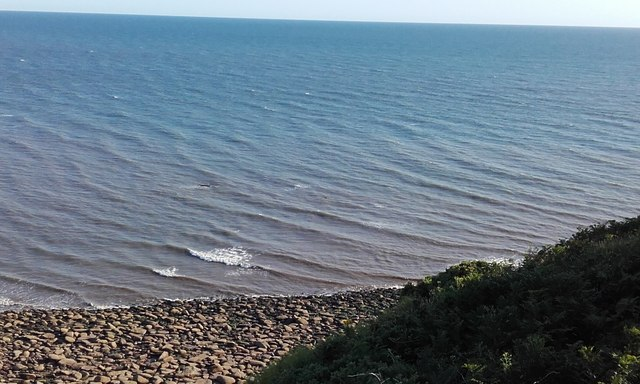
The barely visible SS Izaro wreck, seen from the beach, 2015.
