= Cerulean Warbler Bird Reserve =

Nature reserve near Bucaramanga in central Colombia

- La Reserva Natural de las Aves Reinita Cielo Azul
- Location: Santander Department, Colombia
- Nearest city: Bucaramanga
- Area: 545 acres (221 ha)
- Established: 2005
- Governing body: Fundación ProAves; American Bird Conservancy

The Cerulean Warbler Bird Reserve (Spanish: Reserva Natural de las Aves Reinita Cielo Azul) is a nature reserve near Bucaramanga in central Colombia. The reserve is set among oak forest on the eastern slopes of the Magdalena River. It measures 545 acres (221 ha) and adjoins the Yariguíes National Park.

The reserve was founded in 2005 by Fundación ProAves, a non-profit environmental organization that owns and manages several reserves in Colombia, with the assistance of the American Bird Conservancy. It was established to provide an area of protected habitat for migratory birds from North America such as the cerulean warbler as well as locally threatened species. The reserve has incorporated a 15 hectares (37 acres) coffee farm, producing shade-grown coffee which it promotes and sells as conservation-friendly Cerulean Warbler Coffee to cover the operating costs of the reserve.

== Birds ==
Some 270 bird species have been recorded from the reserve. As well as the cerulean warbler, critically endangered local birds found there include the gorgeted wood-quail, chestnut-bellied hummingbird and mountain grackle. Other threatened species include the rusty-faced parrot, white-mantled barbet, black inca, Upper Magdalena tapaculo, turquoise dacnis and the recurve-billed bushbird. The Yariguies brush-finch is a new subspecies recently discovered just outside the reserve. Other animals of conservation interest include the spectacled bear, crab-eating fox and Santander poison dart frog.

== Access ==
Accommodation is available at the reserve, which is two hours by road from Bucaramanga to San Vicente, and twenty minutes by 4WD vehicle from San Vicente up to the reserve. The lodge is 1,400 metres (4,600 ft) above sea level.
