= Bushbird =

There are three species of bird, in two genera, known as bushbirds:

- Clytoctantes
  - Recurve-billed bushbird, Clytoctantes alixii
  - Rondônia bushbird, Clytoctantes atrogularis
- Neoctantes
  - Black bushbird, Neoctantes niger
