= Yariguies brush finch =

Scientific classification
- Kingdom: Animalia
- Phylum: Chordata
- Class: Aves
- Order: Passeriformes
- Family: Passerellidae
- Genus: Atlapetes
- Species: A. latinuchus
- Subspecies: A. l. yariguierum

Trinomial name
- Atlapetes latinuchus yariguierum Donegan & Huertas, 2006

Subspecies of bird

The Yariguies brush finch (Atlapetes latinuchus yariguierum) is a subspecies of the yellow-breasted brush finch, discovered in 2004 in Colombia.

== Description ==
The feathers of the breast, abdomen, and throat are yellow; those of the coverts, primaries, secondaries, scapulars, auriculars, lores, and tail are black; the crown feathers are russet. It is unique among its conspecifics because it has a jet black back, wing and tail.

== Species discovery ==
The bird has been discovered in the remote Yariguies mountains in an expedition co-led by Thomas Donegan of Fundación ProAves and Blanca Huertas, a curator at the Natural History Museum in London. According to the researchers, the region was so little explored that several more hitherto undescribed birds and butterflies are found there (Donegan & Huertas, 2006). Huertas, a lepidopterologist by training, found several taxa of butterflies new to science (Huertas & Arias 2007). Further information about the biological exploration of the region is found in expedition reports (Donegan & Huertas 2005; Huertas & Donegan 2006). The vernacular name "Yariguies brush finch" was selected because the yellow-breasted brush finch, as a subspecies of which it is currently classified, is to be split into several species, and it is not clear at the moment to which of these the newly described bird would belong (Donegan & Huertas, 2006).

=== Etymology ===
The bird is named after the Yariguies indigenous tribe who give their name to the mountain range where the bird was found. Serranía de los Yariguíes was declared a national park last year by the Colombian government and a large forest nature reserve was recently established in the region by Fundación ProAves, Colombia's bird conservation NGO.
