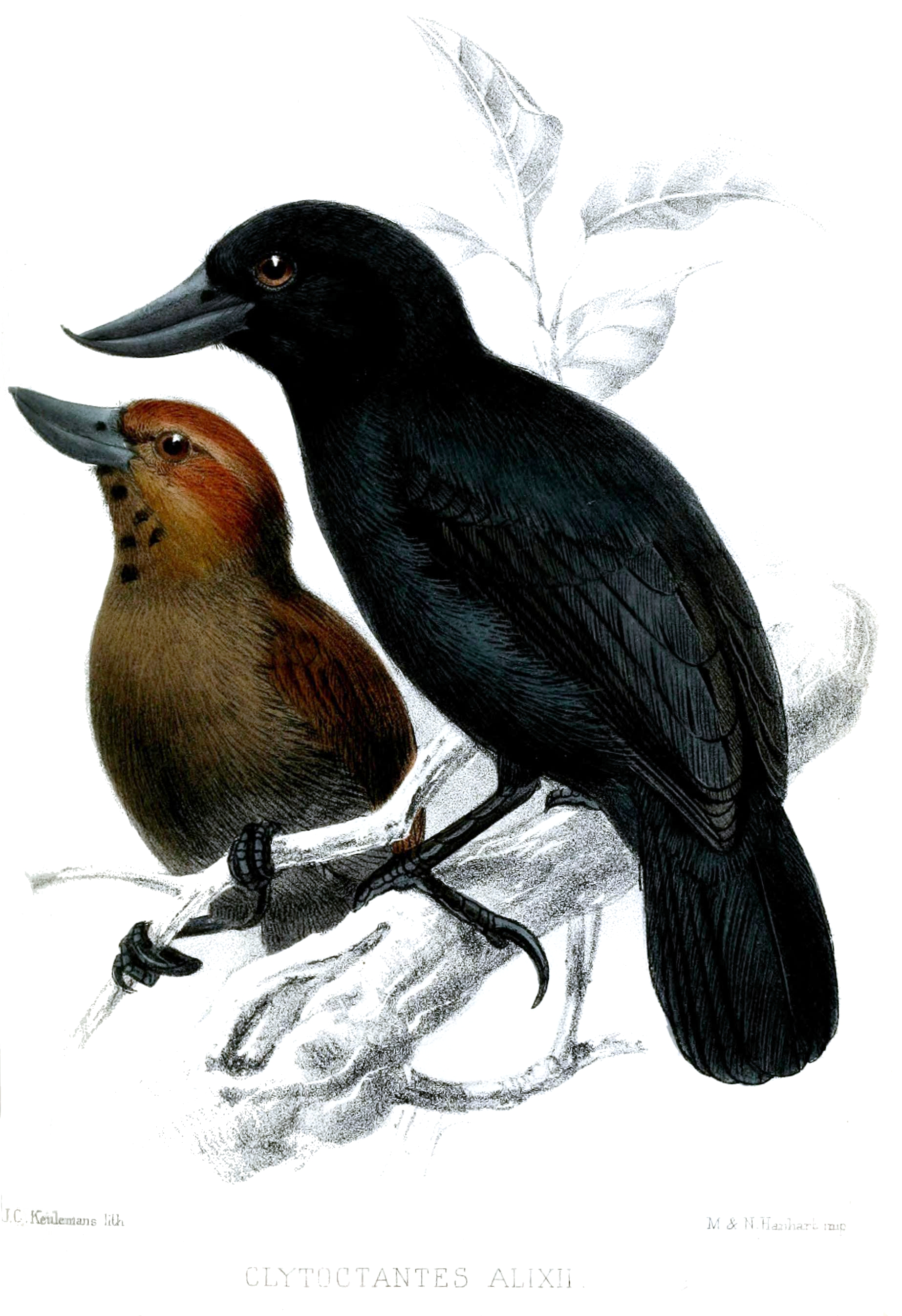
- Recurve-billed bushbird (Clytoctantes alixii)

Scientific classification
- Kingdom: Animalia
- Phylum: Chordata
- Class: Aves
- Order: Passeriformes
- Family: Thamnophilidae
- Genus: Clytoctantes; Elliot, 1870

Type species
- Clytoctantes alixii Elliot, 1870

Species
- See text

= Clytoctantes =

Genus of birds

Clytoctantes is a South American genus of passerine birds in the antbird family, Thamnophilidae. They are medium sized, and males are grey or black and females are mainly rufous. The stubby, hefty bill has a distinctly upcurved lower mandible and a straight culmen (a large version of the bills of the recurvebills), which possibly is a modification for opening bamboo stems in their search for insects.

It comprises two species: the recurve-billed bushbird (Clytoctantes alixii) and the Rondônia bushbird (Clytoctantes atrogularis). Both species inhabit dense, lowland and foothill forests, C. alixii in the northern Andes and C. atrogularis in the Brazilian Amazon.

The two species were feared to be extinct or nearly so, until both were rediscovered in 2004. Monitoring was subsequently conducted between 2014 and 2017, confirming that they remained. They are facing the threat of habitat destruction and enhanced conservation efforts are essential to ensure their long-term survival.

== Taxonomy and classification ==
The genus Clytoctantes belongs to the family Thamnophilidae, a diverse and extensive clade of New World suboscine passerines often called antbirds. Thamnophilidae contains approximately 200 species spread across 63 genera, most of which inhabit tropical forest undergrowth and track swarms of army-ant to dine on insects caught there. Within this family, Clytoctantes is grouped alongside the genus Neoctantes in the tribe Microrhopiini (subfamily Thamnophilinae), a lineage characterized by the presence of robust bills adapted for probing into woody stems and bamboo culms.

Daniel Giraud Elliot erected the genus Clytoctantes in 1870, and the recurve-billed bushbird, Clytoctantes alixii, was designated as the type species. Clytoctantes alixii retains the original binomial and authority and is readily recognized by its unique upward-curved bill. The second species, Clytoctantes atrogularis, was described many years later by Lanyon, Stotz, and Willard in 1991, based on a holotype from the interfluvial forests of Rondônia, Brazil.

== Description ==
Clytoctantes is a genus in the antbird family (Thamnophilidae) found in South America. Males of this genus are predominantly black, while females typically have reddish-brown or chestnut-colored plumage. The genus includes two recognized species: the recurve-billed bushbird (Clytoctantes alixii) and the Rondônia bushbird (Clytoctantes atrogularis).

These birds are medium-sized and sexually dimorphic, with a distinctive, robust, laterally compressed black bill. The lower mandible is sharply upturned, giving the bill a unique shape. The strong resemblance in bill structure and size between Clytoctantes alixii and Clytoctantes atrogularis suggests a shared evolutionary lineage. Their chestnut-colored plumage further supports their classification within the Clytoctantes genus. The holotype of Clytoctantes atrogularis is generally larger than the examined female specimens of Clytoctantes alixii, with a notably longer tail. While Clytoctantes atrogularis has an entirely black bill, preserved specimens of Clytoctantes alixii show pale markings on the bill.

Both species were once thought to be at risk of extinction, but they were rediscovered in 2004. Subsequent monitoring efforts took place between 2014 and 2017, confirming their continued existence.

== Species ==
- Recurve-billed bushbird (Clytoctantes alixii)
- Rondônia bushbird (Clytoctantes atrogularis)

The name "bushbird" is shared with the rather similar, but smaller-billed black bushbird from the monotypic genus Neoctantes.

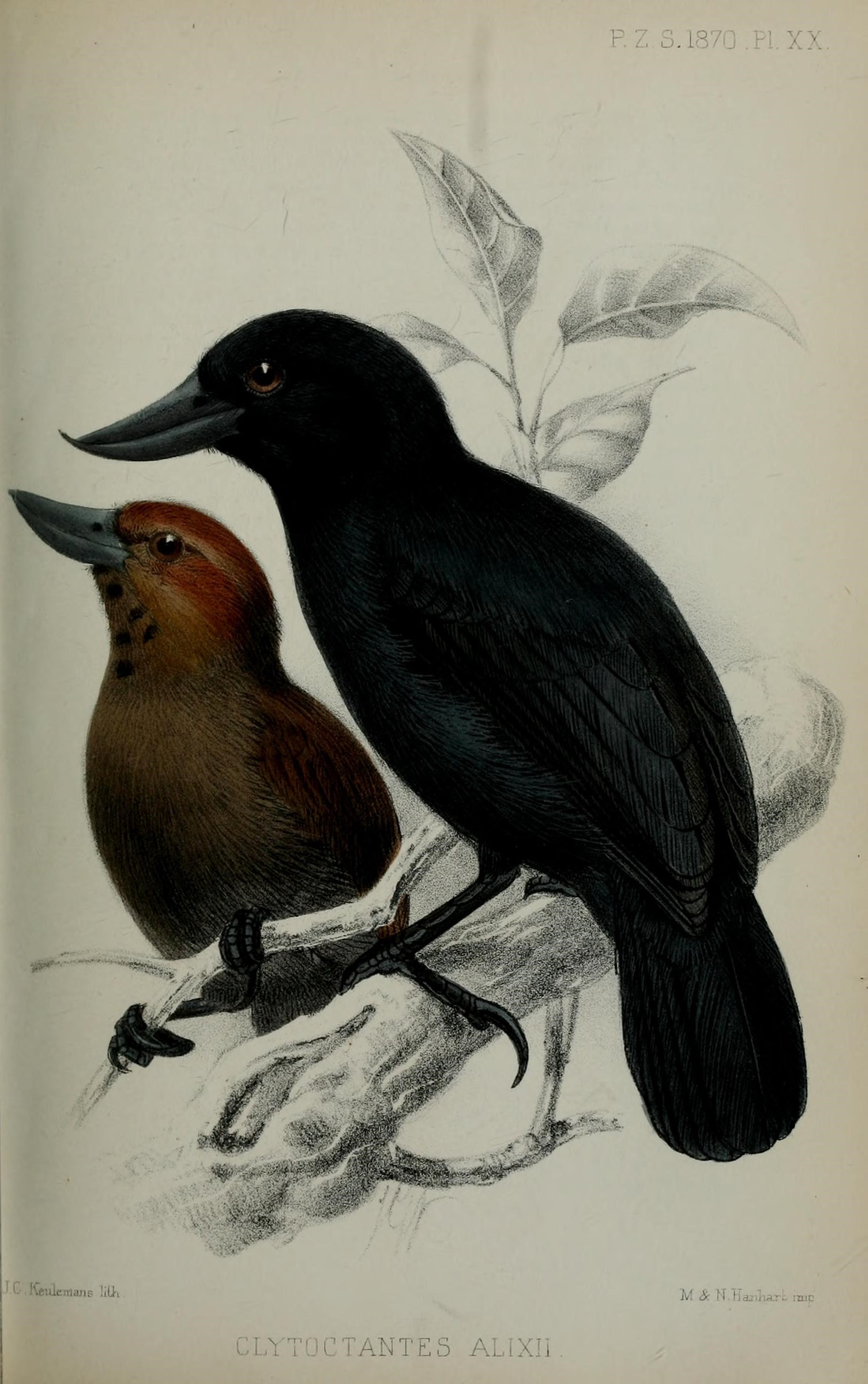
Recurve-billed bushbird (Clytoctantes alixii)

=== Recurve-billed bushbird (Clytoctantes alixii) ===
Clytoctantes alixii is a medium-sized bird with predominantly chestnut-colored plumage. Its most distinctive feature is its uniquely curved bill, which bends upward. While its bill is generally black, preserved specimens show pale markings. Males of Clytoctantes alixii have a striking black throat and breast, which contrast with their dark grey abdomen and back. Their forehead and lores are also black, creating a sharp distinction from the darker brown crown and back. In females, the underparts are a uniform chestnut, and unlike some related species, they do not have a black patch on the throat or breast. A key identifying feature is that both male and female Clytoctantes alixii have spotted wing coverts. In females, these spots are pale buff, while in males, they are black or black with white centers. The lower back and tail coverts in females are brown, and the rectrices are a more muted brownish grey. The contrast in plumage colors is particularly pronounced in males, where the chestnut underparts stand out against the darker upper body.

=== Rondônia bushbird (Clytoctantes atrogularis) ===
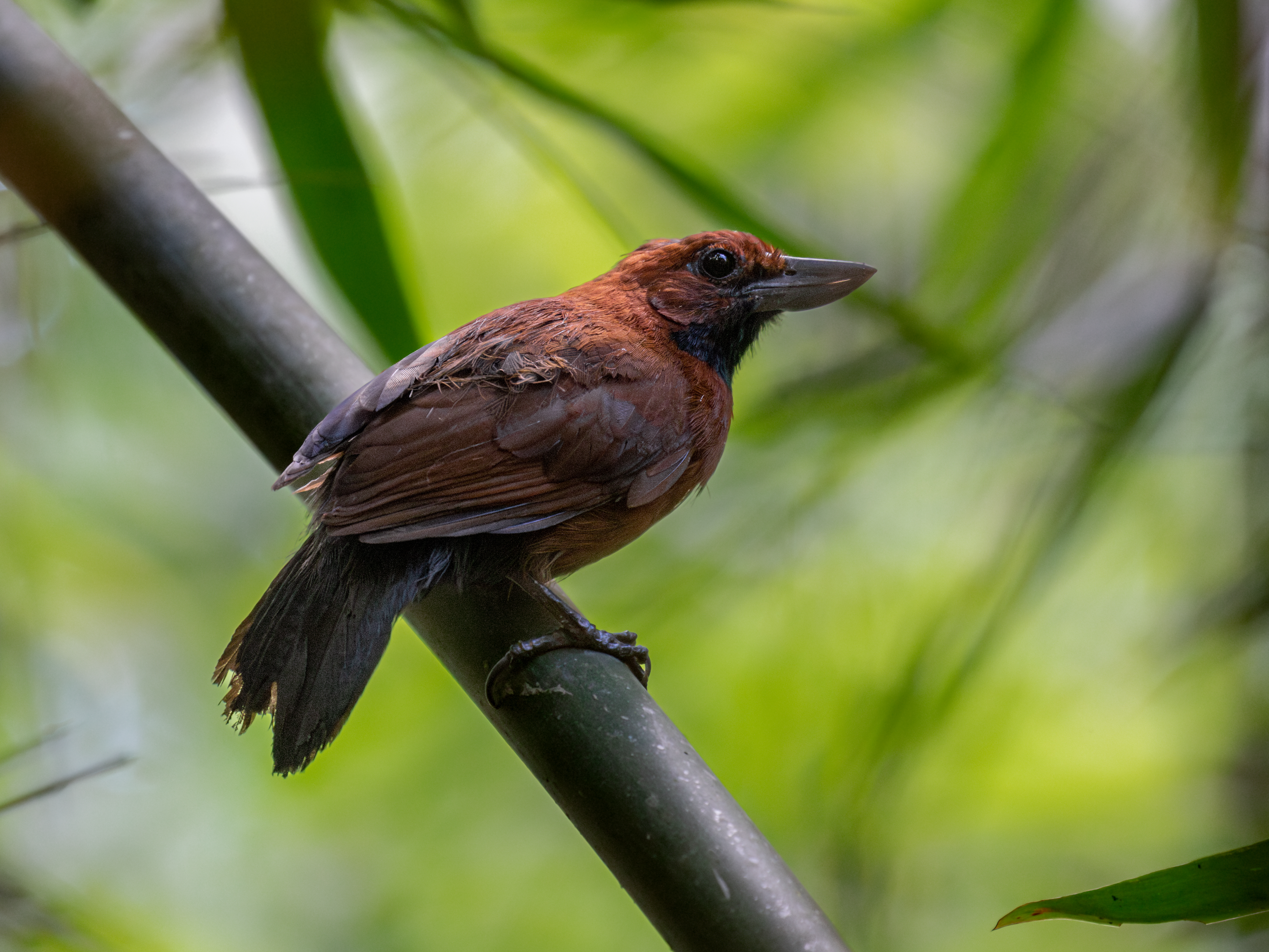
Rondônia bushbird (Clytoctantes atrogularis)

The female Clytoctantes atrogularis has a predominantly chestnut-colored body, with a distinctive black patch covering the chin, throat, and upper breast. Its tail and tail coverts are dark grey, setting it apart from the female Clytoctantes alixii, which lacks this black "bib" and has marked wing coverts. The head and upper back are a deep chestnut, gradually fading to brown on the lower back. A small, hidden white patch is present between the shoulders. The tail feathers are nearly black, while the underparts transition from chestnut on the lower breast and abdomen to grey on the vent and under-tail coverts. The wings are dark chestnut with unmarked upper wing coverts, and the flight feathers are dark brown with lighter brown leading edges. The bill is large, laterally compressed, and features a distinctive upturned lower mandible. In life, the bill, legs, and feet are black, while the eyes are dark brown. The male has an overall dark, blackish-grey plumage, with a slightly darker throat and a concealed white patch on the back. A sub-adult individual has some brownish feathers on the head and wings. The measurement of the holotype shows that its flattened wing measures 79.0 mm and the tail is 64.5 mm.

== Distribution ==
Clytoctantes alixii has a highly restricted range and is known from only a few locations in northwestern Venezuela and northern Colombia. In Venezuela, it has been recorded in the Sierra de Perijá, an isolated mountain range along the border with Colombia. In Colombia, it has been documented in the foothills of the Magdalena Valley, particularly in Santander and Cesar, as well as in the Serranía de San Lucas in Bolívar. Additionally, it has been observed in various foothill locations north of the Andes, including Antioquia, Córdoba, and Caldas. The species was first recorded in 1914 in the Cordillera Central of the Colombian Andes, specifically in northern Antioquia. However, after a sighting in the Serranía de Abibe in 1965, Clytoctantes alixii went unreported for decades, leading to concerns that it might be extinct. It was not until 2004 that the species was rediscovered in Venezuela. A year later, in 2005, another population was found in Norte de Santander, Colombia, at elevations between 1,600 and 1,750 meters—considerably higher than previous records. The southernmost known sighting comes from eastern Caldas.

Clytoctantes atrogularis is a species found exclusively in the Amazon region of Brazil, where it inhabits the forests between the Madeira and Tapajós rivers. Its known range spans the states of Amazonas, Mato Grosso, and Rondônia, with natural boundaries formed by the Madeira River to the west and the Sucunduri and Tapajós rivers to the east. Though initially known from only a few locations, subsequent surveys have expanded the number of recorded sites where Clytoctantes atrogularis has been observed. In Mato Grosso, it has been documented in Alta Floresta and within Igarapés do Juruena State Park. In Amazonas, sightings have occurred along the Rio Sucunduri and near Pousada Rio Roosevelt. In Rondônia, it has been recorded in the Jaru Biological Reserve. These findings suggest that Clytoctantes atrogularis may have a wider distribution within this interfluvial region than previously thought.

== Habitat ==
Clytoctantes alixii inhabits lowland and foothill forests at elevations ranging from 185 to 1,750 meters. It prefers areas with dense undergrowth, including thickets, forest edges, young secondary growth, and regenerating forests. In Venezuela, the species has been observed in the thick understory of secondary habitats, such as old swidden plots, and appears to favor steep slopes with high water runoff in decaying woodland. In Colombia, its habitat varies, with sightings in mature secondary forests with a significant bamboo presence, as well as in overgrown, rocky gullies without bamboo. In Antioquia, Clytoctantes alixii has been found at lower elevations, between 300 and 800 meters, in secondary forests with a dense understory. The species is believed to breed between April and May in the western part of its range, while in Caldas, the reproductive period may begin as early as January. Its feeding behavior primarily involves pecking open hollow stems and branches to extract insects, suggesting an adaptation to foraging in decaying vegetation. The species has been observed foraging in areas with vine tangles and thickets, as well as on dead stems and branches of fallen trees.

Clytoctantes atrogularis lives in the understory of terra firme forests, which are forests that do not flood. It prefers areas with dense vine tangles, understory palms, and small openings created by fallen trees. The species has also been found near small streams and in patches of Guadua bamboo. Although it is mainly found in undisturbed forests, it has occasionally been observed in areas that have been selectively logged or partially cleared for agriculture. In some parts of its range, Clytoctantes atrogularis has been recorded in campinarana forests, a unique type of vegetation in the Brazilian Amazon that grows on white-sand soils. These forests have a low, dense canopy with many small trees but lack large, towering emergent trees and climbing plants like lianas. Clytoctantes atrogularis is insectivorous, primarily eating ants. It looks for food by moving through dense vegetation, likely using its strong, curved bill to dig into branches and leaf litter.

== Behavior ==
Clytoctantes alixii is thought to stay in the same area year-round, with no signs of migration. There is very little known about its diet, but one bird was seen near an army-ant swarm, and another was pulling apart dead plant stems, likely looking for insects. Its breeding habits are also mostly unknown, except that nesting occurs in the west half of the range between April and May. As for sounds, only a few recordings exist. One female in Colombia made a rough, buzzing call that sounded similar to that of Phaenostictus mcleannani.

Clytoctantes atrogularis mainly eats insects, especially ants, like other birds in the antbird family. It has been seen foraging in tangled vines and on bamboo, where it uses its strong bill to split open stems. It also searches for food around the base and coverings of certain palm leaves. This bird moves skillfully, climbing and moving sideways on branches. Stomach studies of a few samples show that it feeds mostly on ants, such as Camponotus, Pheidole, and Pachycondyla, as well as their eggs, including species that live inside bamboo. Males of Clytoctantes atrogularis sing a loud, clear song made up of evenly spaced whistled notes that can be heard from over 100 meters away. Both males and females make a short contact call, usually in a series of seven or eight notes. When alarmed, it gives a slightly chattering call with a faint squeaky tone.

== Status ==
Clytoctantes alixii is currently classified as endangered by the IUCN Red List. This is due to the fact that it has a limited range and declining population. The species occurs in northwestern Venezuela and northern Colombia, with a population of between 150 and 700 mature individuals. In the past, Clytoctantes alixii had been documented from only a few locations, leading to concerns about its conserva tion status. Current observations in some of the locations such as Antioquia and Santander in Colombia suggest that the species could be more widespread than originally assumed. Despite these findings, the overall population trend is still considered to be decreasing. The primary threats to Clytoctantes alixii include habitat loss due to deforestation for farming and cattle ranching. Furthermore, construction of hydroelectric dams poses a major threat to its habitat. The species occurs in conserved reserves such as Paramillo and Perijá National Parks, the ProAves Recurve-billed Bushbird Reserve at Agua de la Virgen, and the Cerulean Warbler Reserve in the Serranía de los Yariguíes.

Clytoctantes atrogularis is listed as Near Threatened on the IUCN Red List. This species is endemic to Brazil, primarily found in the Madeira-Tapajós interfluvium region, including parts of Amazonas, Mato Grosso, and Rondônia. The estimated population ranges from 2,500 to 9,999 mature individuals. Clytoctantes atrogularis was rediscovered in 2006 after remaining unreported since 1986. Though it has been rediscovered, the species remains uncommon throughout its range, with very few records despite extensive surveys. Its major threats to survival are habitat loss due to deforestation, agricultural pressure, and construction projects, such as the construction of hydroelectric dams. Conservation measures for Clytoctantes atrogularis include maintaining protected zones like the Parque Estadual Igarapés do Juruena in Mato Grosso. Ongoing habitat destruction in regions like Mato Grosso and Rondônia continues to pose the biggest threat to the existence of the species.

== Conservation ==
Clytoctantes alixii is classified as endangered in both Colombia and Venezuela due to habitat destruction. It occurs in the recently purchased ProAves Recurve-billed Bushbird Reserve at Agua de la Virgen and the Cerulean Warbler Reserve in the Serranía de los Yariguíes. Cordillera Central is one of the most important areas for its conservation where it is the only known population in the western part of its range. Historically, this area has suffered extensive deforestation, mainly for cattle ranching and the cultivation of illicit crops like coca. Now, the pressure of deforestation remains. The most urgent conservation threat comes from the planned Pescadero-Ituango hydroelectric dam on the Cauca River. Once completed, the dam will flood a significant portion of the species’ habitat. This region is also home to one of the last remaining dry forests in the northern Colombian Andes and it is a highly threatened ecosystem.

Clytoctantes atrogularis is classified as a vulnerable species due to the ongoing loss of its habitat. Although new populations have been discovered, the species remains rare across its known range. The primary threats include deforestation, agricultural expansion, infrastructure development, and illegal logging, particularly in the states of Mato Grosso and Rondônia, where large portions of its habitat have already been cleared. The area where Clytoctantes atrogularis was recorded is poorly protected. Human activities such as power line construction, sand quarrying, and hydroelectric dam projects along the Madeira River have further impacted the landscape. Some areas along the BR-364 highway, where the species might also occur, are at risk of flooding due to dam construction. The creation of conservation areas is crucial to preventing further habitat destruction. In Amazonas, Brazil, a mosaic of nine conservation units has been established, covering approximately 3.07 million hectares of forest, including important areas within the Madeira-Tapajós interfluvium.
