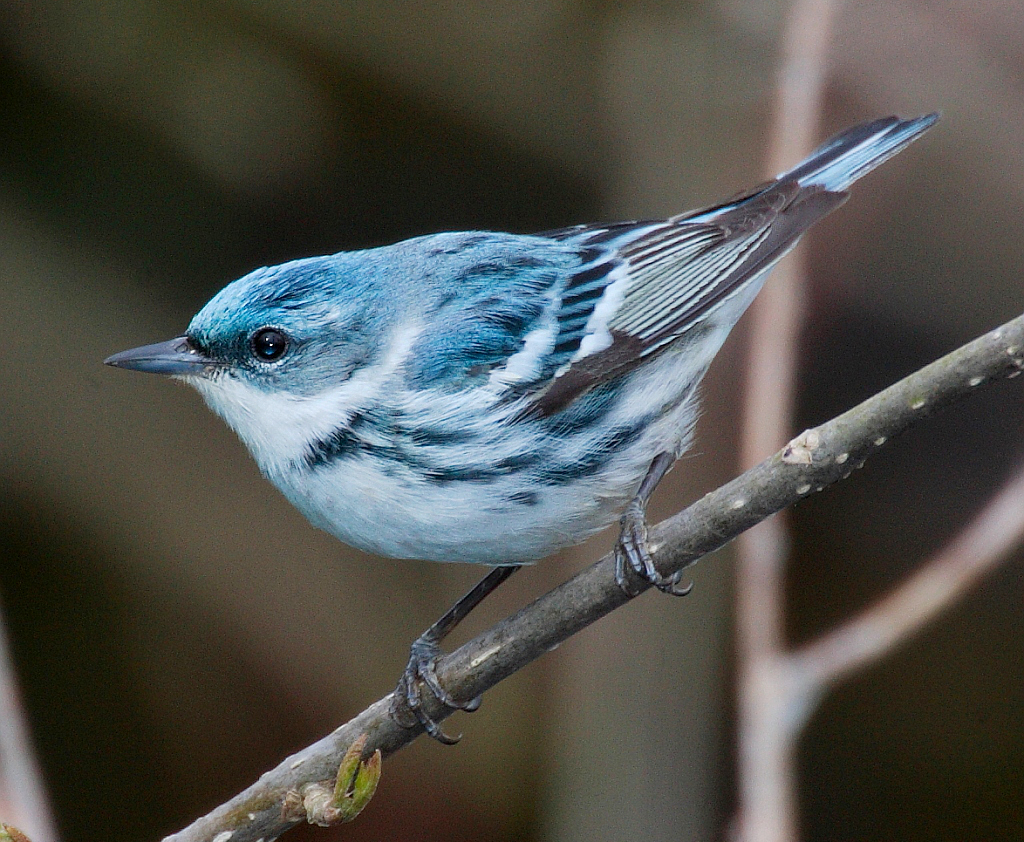
- Adult male cerulean warbler
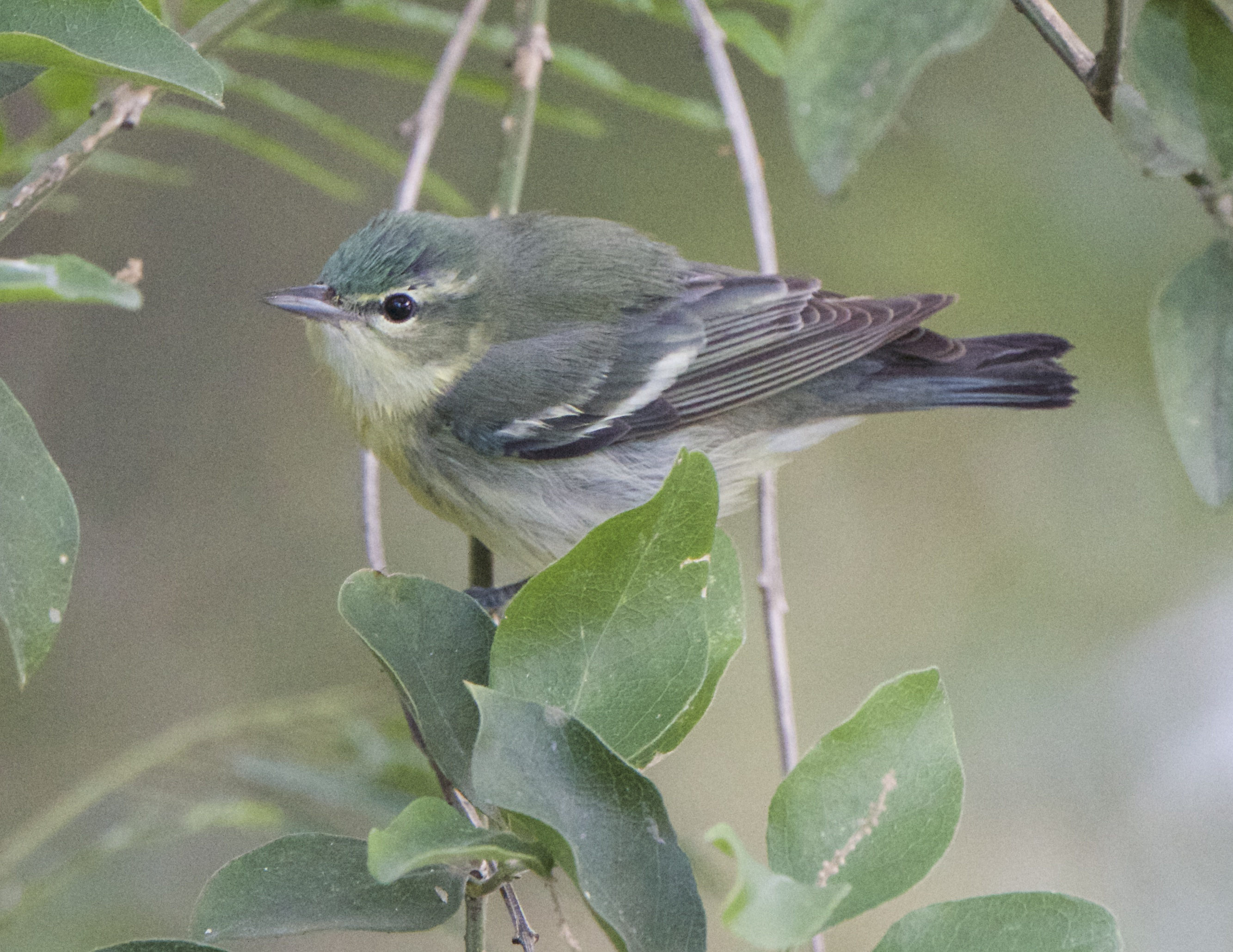
- Adult female cerulean warbler

Conservation status
- Near Threatened (IUCN 3.1)

Scientific classification
- Kingdom: Animalia
- Phylum: Chordata
- Class: Aves
- Order: Passeriformes
- Family: Parulidae
- Genus: Setophaga
- Species: S. cerulea

Binomial name
- Setophaga cerulea (Wilson, 1810)
- Breeding range Migration range Wintering range

Synonyms
- Sylvia cerulea Wilson, 1810; Dendroica cerulea (Wilson, 1810); Dendroica caerulea (Wilson, 1810) (unjustified emendation); Dendroica coerulea (Wilson, 1810) (unjustified emendation); Sylvia rara (Wilson, 1811); Dendroica rara (Wilson, 1811); Sylvia azurea

= Cerulean warbler =

Species of bird

The cerulean warbler (Setophaga cerulea) is a small songbird in the family Parulidae. It is a long-distance migrant, breeding in eastern North American hardwood forests and wintering on the Eastern slope of the Andes in South America during non-breeding season, preferring subtropical forests.

It displays strong sexual dichromatism. Adult males have cerulean blue and white upperparts, with a black necklace across the breast and black streaks on the back and flanks. Females and immature birds have bluish-green upperparts, a pale stripe over the eye, no streaking, and are yellow below. All have two white wing bars and a thin, pointed bill.

The cerulean warbler is insectivorous and predominantly feeds on insect larvae, though it also consumes winged insects. It forages for prey and nests high in forest canopies. Individuals are strongly territorial; males will defend areas of forests. Males arrive on breeding grounds about one to two weeks earlier than females. Breeding and incubation take place from late May to early June.

The species is rated as near threatened on the International Union for Conservation of Nature (IUCN)'s Red List of endangered species, indicating it is under risk of becoming vulnerable in the near future. The population of the cerulean warbler has been under rapid decline, though in recent years this decline has slowed. Deforestation in its non-breeding range continues to reduce its available habitat.

== Taxonomy and systematics ==
The cerulean warbler was described in 1810 as Sylvia cerulea by ornithologist Alexander Wilson. In 1811, Wilson described the female as a separate species, Sylvia rara. It was later realized that the two taxa were conspecific, and in 1838 the biologist Charles Lucien Bonaparte merged them together. In 1842, it was placed in the new genus Dendroica introduced by the ornithologist George Robert Gray. In 2011, Dendroica was merged into the genus Setophaga after molecular studies showed that the two genera were not well delineated. The change was implemented as part of the Fifty-second Supplement to the AOU Checklist of North American Birds. The genus name Setophaga is derived from the Greek ses, "moth", and phagos, "eating". The specific name, cerulea, is derived from caeruleus, Latin for "blue", "azure".

Between 1897 and 1903, it was believed that the name Sylvia cærulea (an unjustified emendation of cerulea) had been preoccupied by the blue-gray gnatcatcher, Polioptila cærulea, as ornithologist John Latham had in 1793 moved the latter species to Sylvia. Therefore, the name Sylvia rara, an obsolete name for the female cerulean warbler, was accepted as Dendroica rara in the Eighth Supplement to the AOU Checklist of North American Birds. However, in 1903, it was found that the change was invalid, and the accepted name reverted to Dendroica cerulea.

The cerulean warbler's close relatives within the genus Setophaga include the Blackburnian warbler (S. fusca), blackpoll warbler (S. striata), chestnust-sided warbler, Wilson's warbler (S. pensylvanica) and bay-breasted warbler (S. castanea). Hybridization with the northern parula (S. americana) has been observed, indicating a close relationship.

The following cladograms show the position of the cerulean warbler among its closest relatives according to Lovette et al. 2010 (left), and Baiz et al. 2021 (right):

Lovette et al. (2010)

- - - Setophaga caerulescens (Black-throated blue warbler)
    - Setophaga magnolia (Magnolia warbler)
  - - Setophaga cerulea (Cerulean warbler)
    - - Setophaga americana (Northern parula)
      - Setophaga pitiayumi (Tropical parula)
  - - - Setophaga castanea (Bay-breasted warbler)
      - Setophaga fusca (Blackburnian warbler)
    - - Setophaga petechia (Yellow warbler)
      - - Setophaga pensylvanica (Chestnut-sided warbler)
        - Setophaga striata (Blackpoll warbler)

Baiz et al. (2021)

- - - Setophaga magnolia (Magnolia warbler)
    - - Setophaga americana (Northern parula)
      - Setophaga pitiayumi (Tropica parula)
  - - Setophaga cerulea (Cerulean warbler)
    - - Setophaga fusca (Blackburnian warbler)
      - - - Setophaga castanea (Bay-breasted warbler)
          - Setophaga striata (Blackpoll warbler)
        - - Setophaga pensylvanica (Chestnut-sided warbler)
          - Setophaga petechia (Yellow warbler))

== Description ==
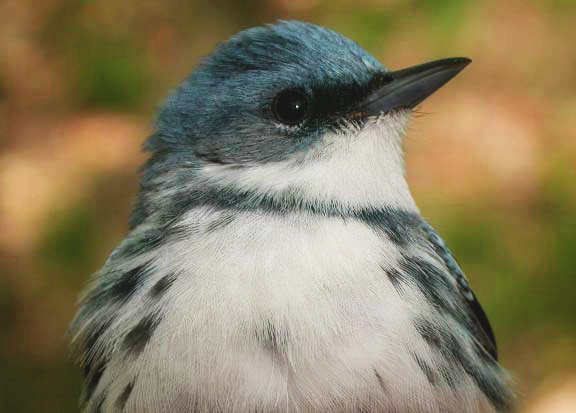
Adult male Cerulean warbler close-up, showing "necklace" and streaking

Song and calls

The cerulean warbler is one of the smallest Setophaga wood-warblers, about 11 cm (4.3 in) long, weighing 8–10 g (0.28–0.35 oz), and having a wingspan of 20 cm (7.9 in). Males are slightly larger than females, and older males tend to also be larger. Wing chord measures 62–66 mm (2.4–2.6 in), while the tail is 40.6–42.7 mm (1.60–1.68 in) long. The culmen, or upper edge of the beak, measures 9.5–9.8 mm (0.37–0.39 in) long, 3.5 mm (0.14 in) wide and 3.5 mm (0.14 in) height.

The cerulean warbler is strongly sexually dichromatic. Adult males are a deep, cerulean blue over the entire back, and are white below. There are prominent dark streaks across the flanks. A "necklace" or breast band, a line of color across the neck, varies from blue to near black. Older individuals have stronger colors across the entire body, including brighter whites, darker streaking, and wider breast bands. Adult females are yellow underneath, while the back and crown have a blue-green tint. Females also possess a distinct pale supercilium, or eye stripe, just above the eye.

Immature individuals are generally similar to adult females, though the back may be more yellowish. All fledged individuals, regardless of their age or sex, have two prominent white wing-bars and white spots on the tail.

The beak and legs of the cerulean warbler vary in color depending on an individual's age and sex. Adult males have a black beak, with the lower half a slightly lighter dark gray. Adult females have dark gray beaks that may become dark brown on the lower half. Recently fledged birds have a brownish beak. Adults have black legs and brown irises, while juveniles have dark brown legs and dark brown irises. Hatchlings have pink bare parts, including the beak and legs, and black eyes.

Their song is a buzzed, accelerating zray zray zray zray zeeee. The primary call is a buzzy, metallic zzee. Males use their songs to attract potential mates and to mark out their territory. Cerulean warblers are also capable of imitating the songs of other birds alongside their typical song. Females rarely sing, but often call when nesting. An alarm call is used to signal the arrival of a predator or another bird threatening the nest.

== Distribution and habitat ==
The cerulean warbler's preferred summer habitat consists of large, unfragmented mature deciduous hardwood forests. Nesting takes place in the top canopy, often above heights of 30 m (98 ft), and territories are typically about 2 ha (4.9 acres). Foraging is done throughout the mid to high canopy. Generally, a forested area of greater than 700 ha (1,700 acres) is required to support a population of cerulean warblers. Riparian areas are commonly selected.

The breeding range extends from southern Tennessee to southern Ontario, and is bounded in the east by the Atlantic Ocean and on the west by the Great Plains. The majority of the population breeds in forests of the Appalachian mountains, with smaller numbers in forests throughout the United States and Canada. Historically, the cerulean warbler was common to abundant as far south as Alabama and Mississippi, but loss of habitat in these southern regions has caused the center of its breeding range to shift northwards.

The cerulean warbler migrates distances of over 5,000 km (3,100 mi) between its breeding and non-breeding ranges. In the spring, it takes an overland route through Central America, passing over water only to cross the Gulf of Mexico at the Yucatán Peninsula. In the autumn, it may overfly the Caribbean Sea, crossing from Florida to Cuba and onto continental South America. Migration takes from 40–70 days; much of this time is made up of stopovers, where birds will remain at one individual location for 2–18 days.

The non-breeding range covers a broad area of northern South America, and extends southwards along the Andes mountains. Individuals have been found as far south as Bolivia, while in the north it is often found throughout Colombia and Venezuela. The cerulean warbler prefers tall forest; its occurrence is therefore strongly correlated with the presence of old-growth subtropical forests or shade coffee plantations. It is found at altitudes of 500–2,000 m (1,600–6,600 ft) in its non-breeding range.

The cerulean warbler has been recorded as a vagrant to Iceland. One has also been recorded in Florianópolis in the far southeast of Brazil, over 2,500 km (1,600 mi) outside of its normal wintering range.

== Behavior ==
=== Feeding ===
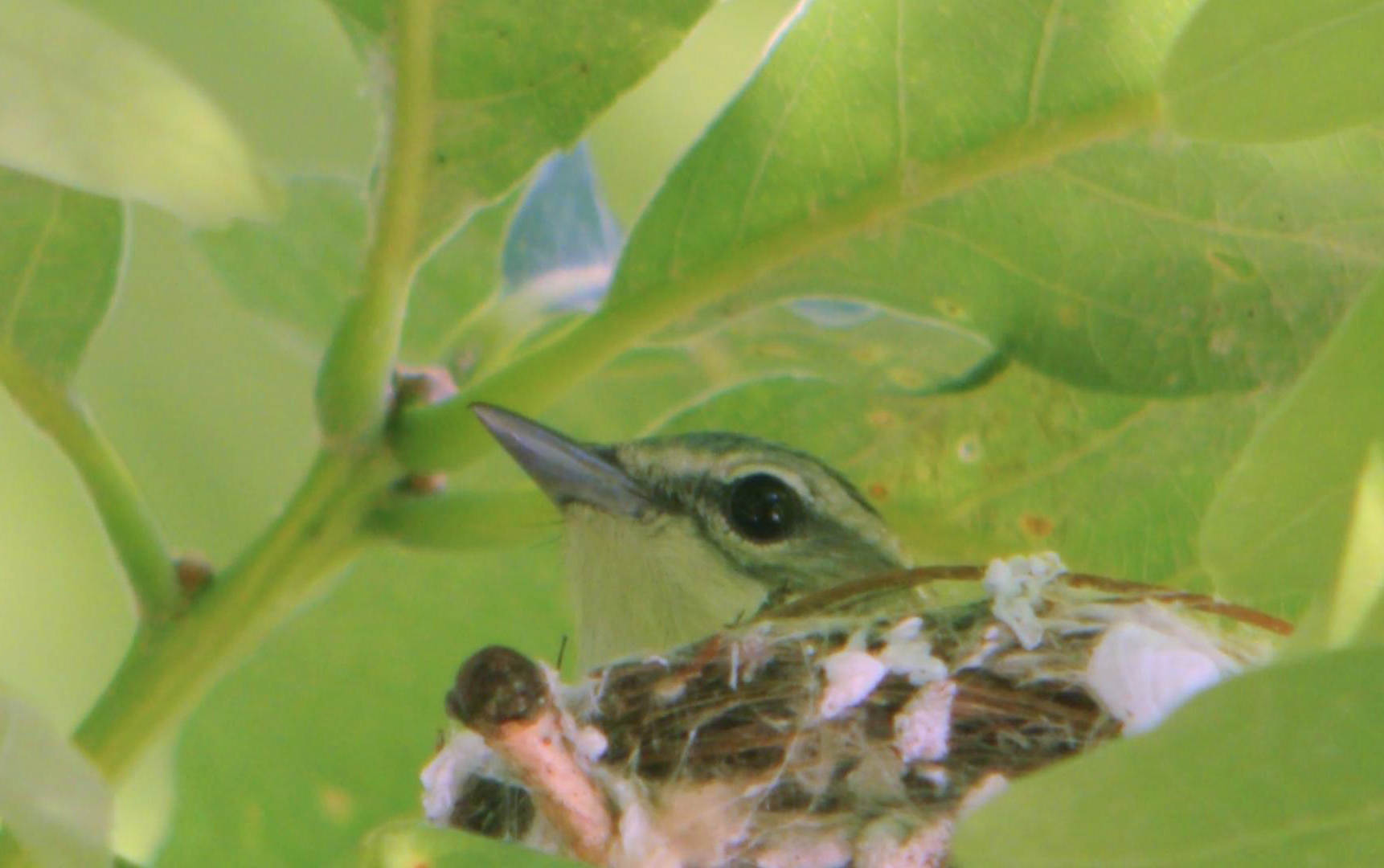
Female cerulean warbler in the nest

The cerulean warbler forages throughout the forest canopy, predominantly at middle to top layers. It hops from branch to branch, gleaning small soft-bodied insects from leaves and twigs. In the non-breeding season, it may also glean insects from flowers. Its preferred prey consists of butterfly and moth (lepidopteran larvae), though it supplements its diet with winged insects. In its non-breeding range, it preferentially forages on trees of the genus Inga.

Foraging is vertically segregated; males tend to forage at somewhat higher elevations in the canopy than females. The difference in height average is about 2 m (6.6 ft). They stay with mixed-species flocks as they forage, sharing spaces with species such as the American redstart (Setophaga ruticilla), Blackburnian warbler, and Tennessee warbler (Leiothlypis peregrina). The other species forage at different heights and substrates, preventing competition. At the high elevations and relatively sparser vegetation that the cerulean warbler prefers, the gleaning technique it uses is more effective than aerial maneuvring. Foraging locations tend to be lower than nest placements.

=== Breeding ===
The cerulean warbler is monogamous. Its short breeding season allows it to produce one brood a year. Individuals are very aggressive towards others of the same sex during the breeding season. Typical conflict comprises the use of song to mark a territory, as well as physical conflict such as attacks in which individuals may fall from heights of 20 m (66 ft). Female cerulean warblers have been observed to attack other females and destroy their eggs.

Nest construction takes about 7 days. The female lays from 3 to 5 eggs over the course of about 7 days, incubation lasts for around 12 days, and nestlings remain altricial for an average of 11 days. Only the female broods the nest, but the male will frequently provide food for the female and for the young. The female occasionally responds with a call. During nesting, the female vocalizes a chip call whenever it leaves the nest. In response, the male returns to the nest, guarding it from a nearby perch.

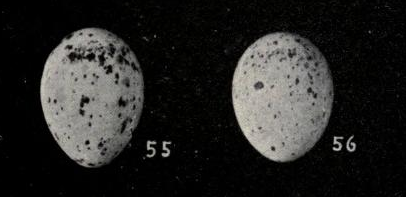
Cerulean warbler eggs

Extra-pair copulation, in which mating occurs outside of a monogamous pair, is known to occur. Based on blood analyses, several young may be sired by a different male than that which occupies the territory on which the young are found, making it likely that males travelling outside of their own territories seek extra-pair copulations. Males engage in mate guarding, in which they will remain close to the mate during periods of foraging, nest building, or nest site selection. The male will also frequently sing a "whisper song"; the female occasionally responds with a call.

During nest incubation, and when young are in the nestling stage, the female may also sing. The song, a more complex variation of the typical nest call, is a metallic zee zeet zee zeet zeet.

Both males and females are involved in nest construction and together choose a nest site. Sites are usually located on horizontal branches high in the forest canopy, and are usually shaded by vegetation. The cerulean warbler prefers to nest over an empty space where there are no branches for 1 m (3.3 ft) or more. The nest itself is made from tree bark, grasses, and lichens, woven together using caterpillar silk and spider thread. If a nesting attempt is unsuccessful, individuals will often reuse materials from an old nest, especially binding elements. Cerulean warblers have been observed to construct "double-decker" nests, in which a new nest is overlaid atop an existing one. Nearly all known nests have been in deciduous trees, but nesting has been recorded in pine trees in southern Indiana.

After the eggs have hatched, nestlings are fed by their parents, mainly consuming lepidopteran larvae. The fledglings become independent about 12 days after leaving the nest. Survival rates range from 34–62% for the fledgling stage of development. Newly fledged birds are often killed by chipmunks through predation. Young individuals have somewhat different feeding patterns than adults, preferring riparian areas with relatively little foliage.

=== Predators and parasites ===
The cerulean warbler's preferred nesting sites, located high in the forest canopy, reduce the prevalence of nest predation. However, its eggs and young still fall victim to predators such as raccoons, squirrels, chipmunks, snakes, and even other birds, in particular blue jays (Cyanocitta cristata).

The cerulean warbler is known to be parasitized by blood parasites such as Haemoproteus paruli. Nest parasitism by brown-headed cowbirds (Molothrus ater) occurs, but is less common in the dense interior canopy the cerulean warbler prefers.

== Status and conservation ==
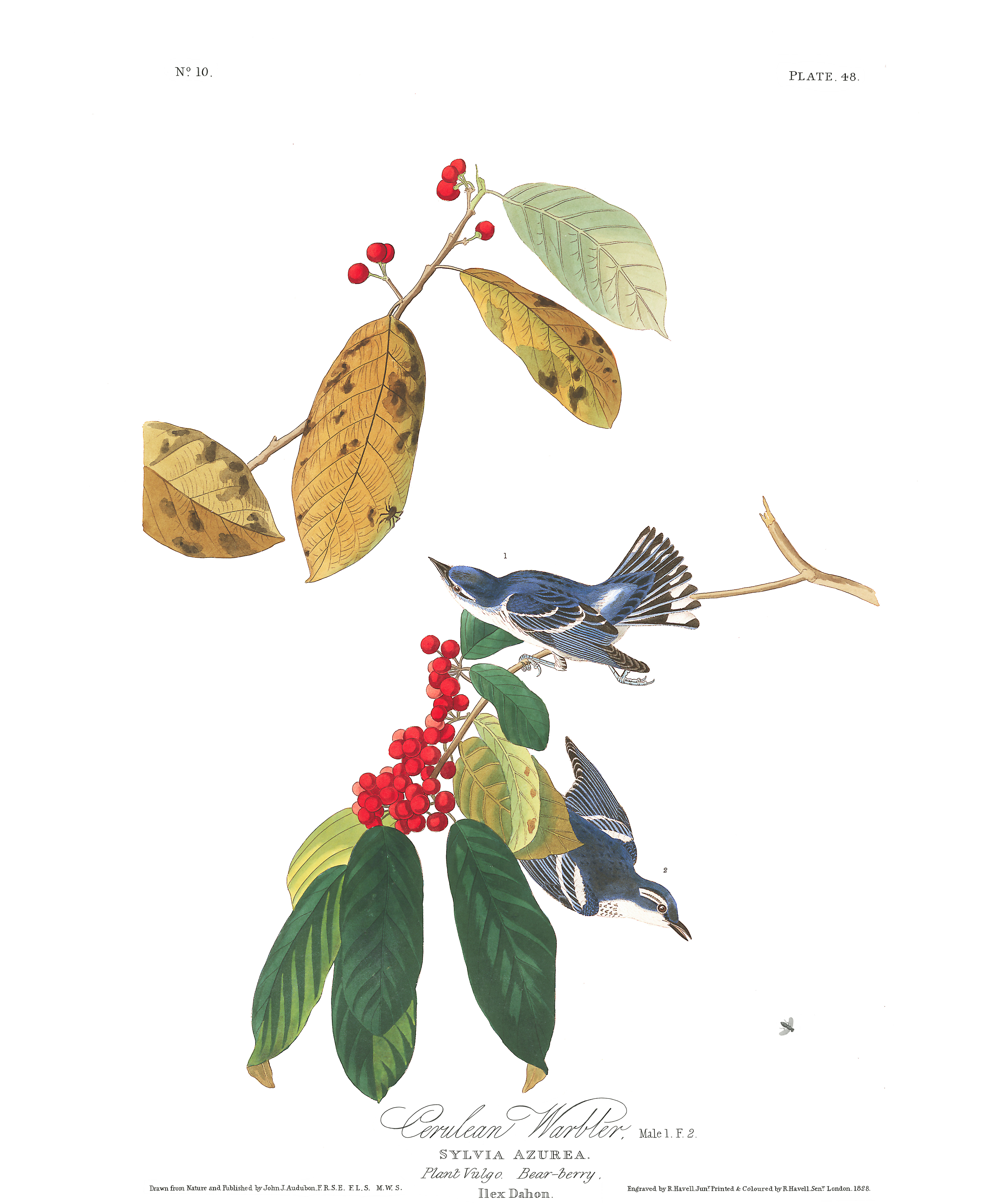
"Azure Warbler" in Birds of America

The cerulean warbler is currently rated a near threatened species by the International Union for Conservation of Nature. It is the fastest declining Neotropical migrant songbird. Among the many threats it faces, its wintering habitat in the northern Andes is dwindling rapidly. Cerulean warblers depend on shade coffee plantations for the mature forest habitat they require. This traditional farming technique faces pressure from fluctuating world coffee prices, and many tracts of shade coffee are being converted to higher-yield sun coffee or other crops.

In fragmented forest areas, the cerulean warbler is vulnerable to nest parasitism by the brown-headed cowbird. Historically, the preferred habitat of tall forest interiors protected it from brood parasitism, but deforestation has caused the cerulean warbler to often choose nest locations accessible to cowbirds.

This bird's numbers are declining faster than any other warbler species in the USA; its population in 2006 was less than one-fifth of what it was 40 years before. The American Bird Conservancy (ABC) is working with its Colombian partner, Fundación ProAves, to protect wintering habitat for cerulean warblers and other migratory songbirds. In 2008, the partnership created the Cerulean Warbler Bird Reserve, the first protected area created for a neotropical migrant. In an effort to advance protection of the cerulean warbler, ABC and its South American partners (Fundacion ProAves, ECOAN and Fundacion Jocotoco), in 2009 produced a Cerulean Warbler Wintering Ground Conservation Plan.

== In art and culture ==
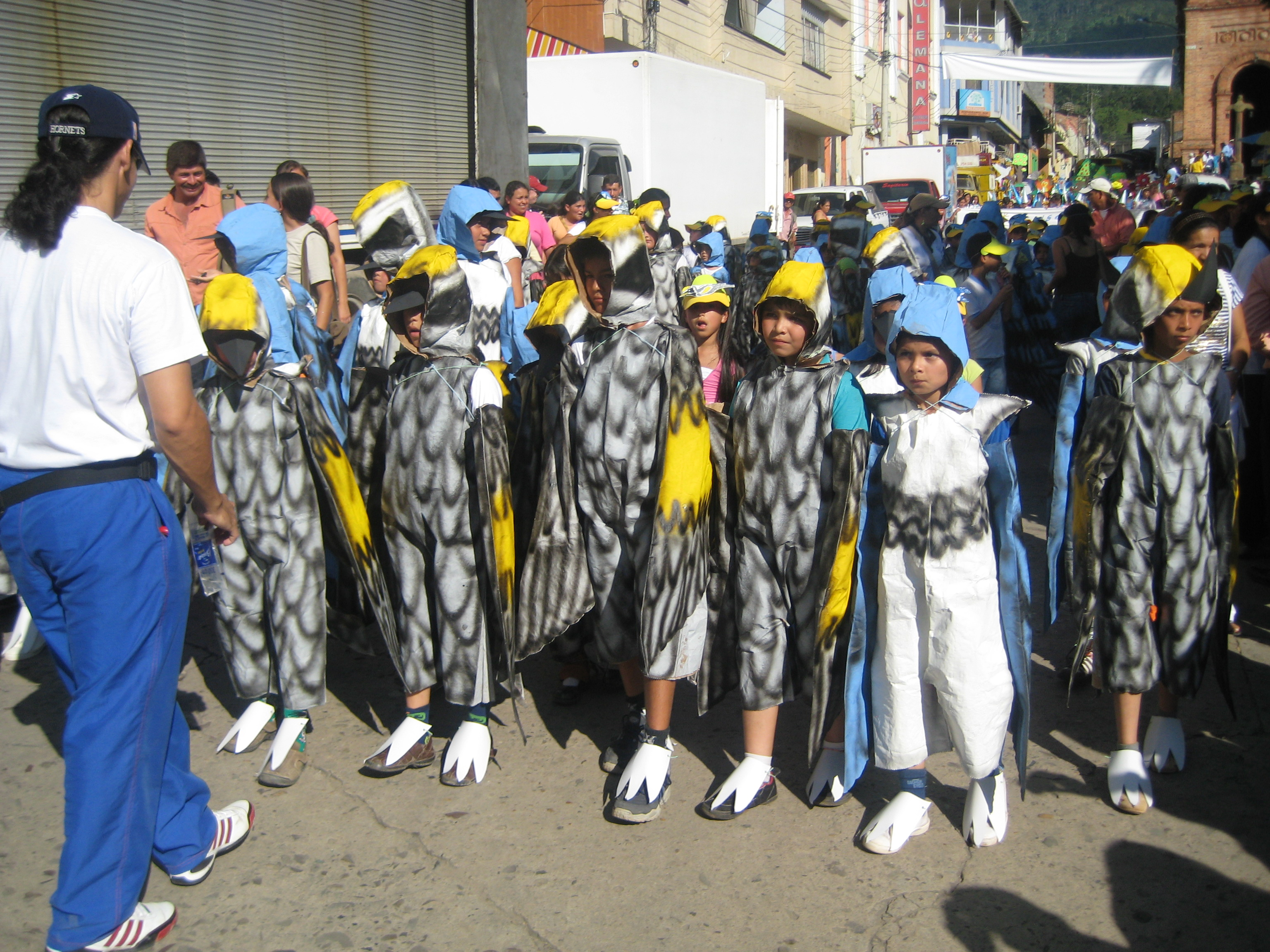
San Vicente Migratory Bird Festival

Artist and ornithologist John James Audubon illustrates the cerulean warbler in Birds of America (London, 1827–38) as Plate 48, where two birds are shown perched in a dahoon holly bush. The painting was originally produced in 1822, and engraved and colored by Robert Havell's London workshops. The original watercolor by Audubon was purchased by the New-York Historical Society, where it remains as of 2022.

The novelist Jonathan Franzen uses the cerulean warbler as a plot device in his 2010 novel Freedom.

In San Vicente, Colombia, the cerulean warbler is commemorated in an annual migratory bird festival.

The Man in the Yellow Hat publishes a book about the cerulean warbler in the episode "The Big Picture" of Curious George.
