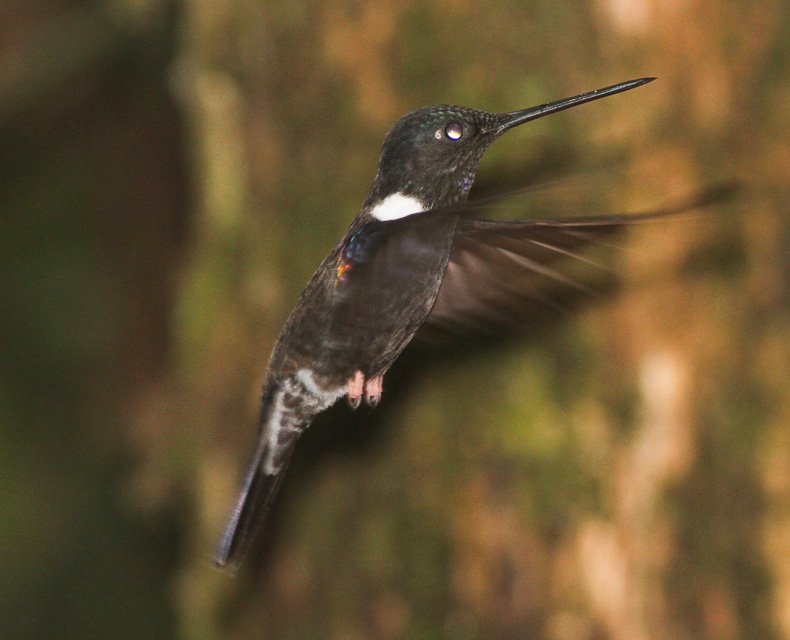

Conservation status
- Vulnerable (IUCN 3.1)
- CITES Appendix II

Scientific classification
- Kingdom: Animalia
- Phylum: Chordata
- Class: Aves
- Clade: Strisores
- Order: Apodiformes
- Family: Trochilidae
- Genus: Coeligena
- Species: C. prunellei

Binomial name
- Coeligena prunellei (Bourcier, 1843)

= Black inca =

Species of hummingbird

The black inca (Coeligena prunellei) is a species of hummingbird in the "brilliants", tribe Heliantheini in subfamily Lesbiinae. It is endemic to Colombia.

== Taxonomy and systematics ==
In the mid-1800s the black inca was placed in genera Bourcieria and Lamproygia by different authors. By the early 1900s it and most other current members of genus Coeligena were placed in genus Helianthea. The incas have been in their current placement since the mid-1900s. The black inca, bronzy inca (C. coeligena), and brown inca (C. wilsoni) are sister species.

The black inca is monotypic.

== Description ==
The black inca is about 14 cm (5.5 in) long and weighs about 6.6 to 7.0 g (0.23 to 0.25 oz). Both sexes have a long, straight, black bill and a white spot behind the eye. Adult males' upperparts are purplish black with dark metallic blue shoulders and a black forked tail. Their underparts are also dark purplish black with an iridescent blue-green gorget and a white patch on each side of the breast. Adult females are essentially the same as males but duller, with a longer bill, less blue on the shoulders, and a less forked tail. Immatures are duller than the adults and do not have a gorget.

== Distribution and habitat ==
The black inca is endemic to Colombia. It is found on the west slope of the Eastern Andes from southeastern Santander and western Boyacá departments south into western Cundinamarca Department, and also on both slopes of Serranía de los Yariguíes in Santander. It mostly inhabits the interior of humid montane forest, especially those dominated by oaks, but males are also found in fragmented forest and other human-modified landscapes. In elevation it ranges between 1,200 and 2,800 m (3,900 and 9,200 ft).

== Behavior ==
=== Movement ===
The black inca's movements, if any, are not known.

=== Feeding ===
The black inca mostly forages for nectar by trap-lining, visiting a circuit of a wide variety of flowering plants, though it occasionally defends concentrated flower patches. It nectars at mid-levels within forest and low levels at the edges. It prefers tubular red and yellow flowers such as those of genera Fuchsia, Bomarea, Aetanthus, Aphelandra, Palicourea, Psammisia, and Thibaudia. It prefers native plants when they are abundant but in one study frequented plants of genus Abutilon and other introduced species. In addition to feeding on nectar, the black inca gleans small arthropods from foliage.

=== Breeding ===
The black inca's breeding season is not well known but could be as long as from June to February. Only two nests are known. They were cups of tree fern scales cemented with spider silk and lined with plant down. Both were in the interior of oak forest and placed between 1.5 and 1.8 m (5 and 6 ft) above the ground. The species' incubation times and time to fledging are not known.

=== Vocalization ===
The black inca is generally quiet but does produce short ick or pip notes.

== Status ==
The IUCN originally assessed the black inca as Threatened. It changed the assessment to Vulnerable in 1994, to Endangered in 2000, and back to Vulnerable in 2008. Its population is estimated to be than 7,500 mature individuals as of 2022 and is believed to be decreasing. Colombian authorities consider it endangered. About 90% of the forest habitat in its small range has been cleared for settlement or agriculture and what remains is fragmented.
