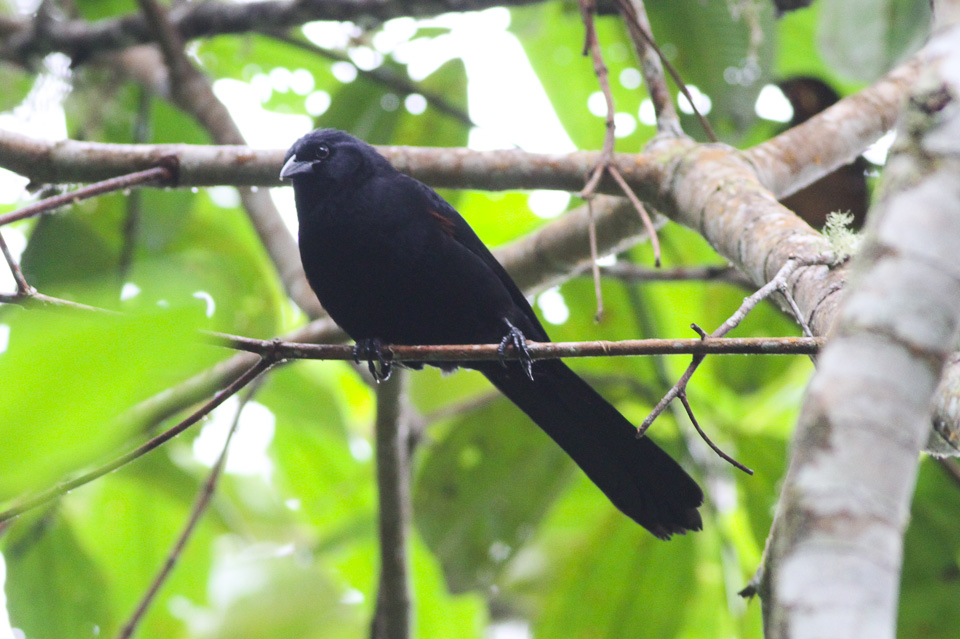

Conservation status
- Endangered (IUCN 3.1)

Scientific classification
- Kingdom: Animalia
- Phylum: Chordata
- Class: Aves
- Order: Passeriformes
- Family: Icteridae
- Genus: Macroagelaius
- Species: M. subalaris

Binomial name
- Macroagelaius subalaris (Boissonneau, 1840)

= Colombian mountain grackle =

Species of bird

The Colombian mountain grackle or mountain grackle (Macroagelaius subalaris) is an Endangered species of bird in the family Icteridae, the oropendolas, New World orioles, and New World blackbirds. It is endemic to Colombia.

== Taxonomy and systematics ==
The Colombian mountain grackle was formally described in 1840 with the binomial Quiscalus sub-alaris. Some early twentieth century authors treated it and what is now the golden-tufted mountain grackle (M. imthumi) as conspecific. They are now the only members of genus Macroagelaius and form a superspecies.

The Colombian mountain grackle is monotypic.

== Description ==
The Colombian mountain grackle is 27 to 30 cm (11 to 12 in) long. It is slender and has a long tail. The sexes have the same plumage. Adults are almost entirely black overlain with a blue gloss. Their axillaries and underwing coverts are dark chestnut; this color is seldom visible in the field. They have a dark brown iris, a black bill, and black legs and feet. Juveniles are dusky brown with less gloss and chestnut than adults.

== Distribution and habitat ==
The Colombian mountain grackle is found on the western slope of the northern part of Colombia's Eastern Andes in Norte de Santander, Santander, and Boyacá departments. It inhabits humid montane forest heavy with epiphytes. It especially favors forest of the oak Quercus humboldtii. Sources differ slightly on its elevational range. One says it is 1,900 to 3,100 m (6,200 to 10,200 ft) and another says 2,000 to 3,200 m (6,600 to 10,500 ft).

== Behavior ==
=== Movement ===
The Colombian mountain grackle is believed to be a year-round resident.

=== Feeding ===
The Colombian mountain grackle's diet has not been fully described but is known to include insects, other arthropods, and berries. It forages among leaves and epiphytes, typically between about 15 and 30 m (50 and 100 ft) above the ground. It roams in flocks with yellow-rumped caciques (Cacicus cela) and sometimes in flocks that include several icterids and members of other bird families.

=== Breeding ===
The Colombian mountain grackle breeds between May and September. It does not breed in colonies but is a cooperative breeder with up to five adults in a group. Group members build the nest, an open cup made from plant materials such as leaves and fibers. It is typically in an oak tree between about 5 and 10 m (15 and 35 ft) above the ground. Many nests are partially hidden in living vegetation or clumps of leaf litter. The clutch size, incubation period, and time to fledging are not known. Group members provision nestlings but other details of care are not known.

=== Vocalization ===
The Colombian mountain grackle's song is "variable, sometimes starting with low clicks and buzzing notes, followed by series of different warbled or whistled motifs, each one usually repeated 2–4 times". Its repetitive pattern has been likened to the song of a mockingbird (Mimus). Its calls include "sharp check and chuip notes".

== Status ==
The IUCN originally in 1994 assessed the Colombian mountain grackle as Near Threatened, then in 2000 as Critically Endangered, and since 2007 as Endangered. It has a very small and fragmented range and its estimated population of between 600 and 1700 mature individuals is believed to be decreasing. The principle threat is destruction of its preferred oak forest for timber, mining access, and conversion to pasture and agriculture. A field guide to Colombian birds calls it uncommon. It does occur in a few national parks and other protected areas.
