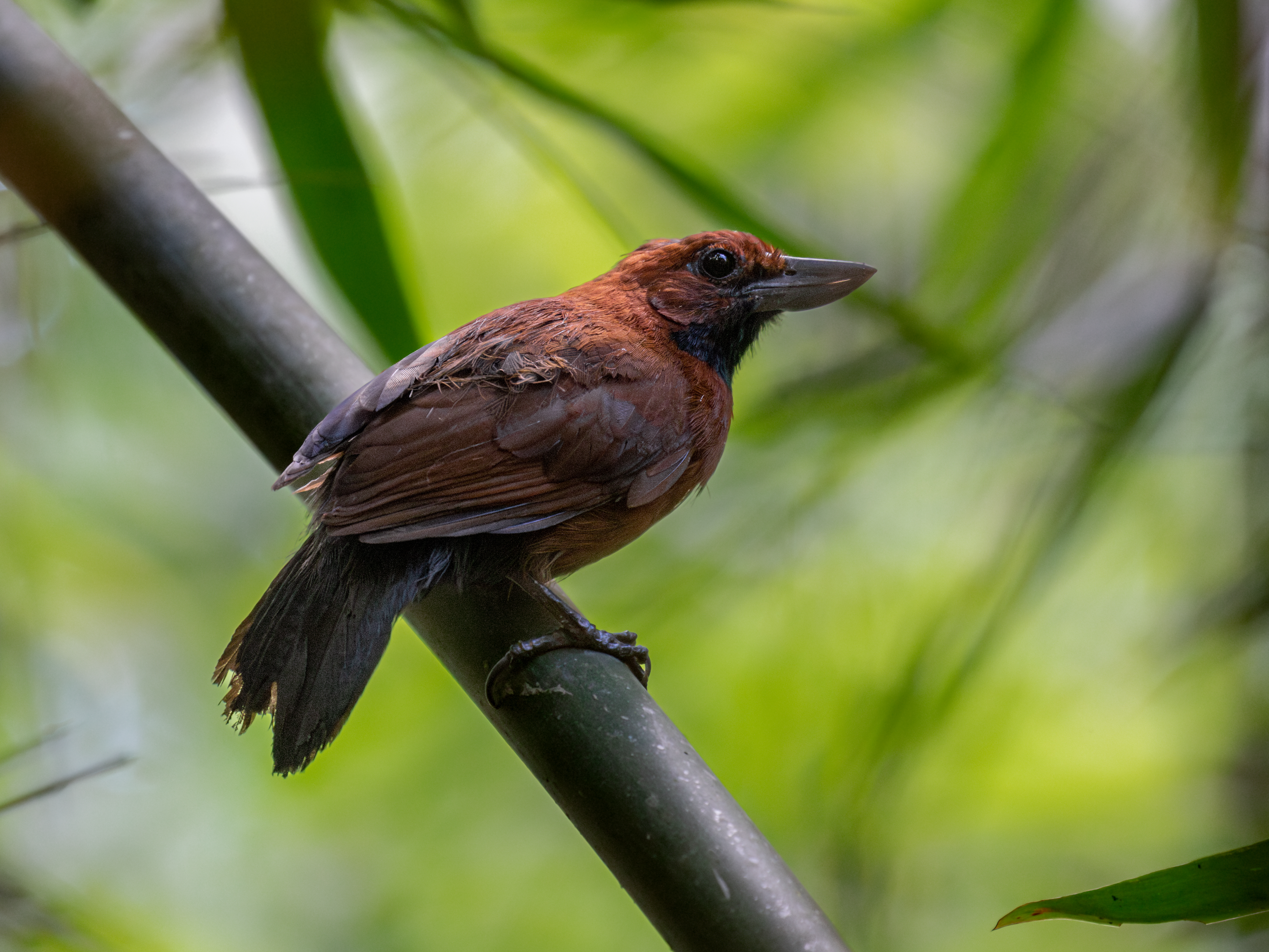
- Female Rondonia bushbird
- Rondonia bushbird song

Conservation status
- Near Threatened (IUCN 3.1)

Scientific classification
- Kingdom: Animalia
- Phylum: Chordata
- Class: Aves
- Order: Passeriformes
- Family: Thamnophilidae
- Genus: Clytoctantes
- Species: C. atrogularis

Binomial name
- Clytoctantes atrogularis Lanyon, Stotz & Willard, 1991

= Rondônia bushbird =

Rondonia bushbird

Species of bird

The Rondonia bushbird (Note: The IOC and other taxonomic systems spell the English name with no diacritics. Some authors spell it Rondônia. The IOC is the Wikipedia standard for bird names.) (Clytoctantes atrogularis) is a Near Threatened species of bird in subfamily Thamnophilinae of family Thamnophilidae, the "typical antbirds". It is endemic to Brazil.

== Taxonomy and systematics ==
The Rondonia bushbird was first described to science in 1991 from sightings and a specimen collected in 1986. It was not again recorded away from the type locality until 2005.

The Rondonia bushbird is monotypic. It shares genus Clytoctantes with the recurve-billed bushbird (C. alixii) and the two are closely related to the black bushbird (Neoctantes niger).

== Description ==
The Rondonia bushbird is 16 to 18.5 cm (6.3 to 7.3 in) long and weighs about 31 to 36 g (1.1 to 1.3 oz). It is rather stocky with a short tail. Its large bill is laterally compressed and the mandible is upturned. The sexes have different plumage. Adult males are mostly dark gray, with a hidden white patch between their shoulders and a slightly blacker bib. Adult females have a chestnut head and upper back, with a concealed white patch like the male's. Their lower back is brown, their uppertail coverts gray, and their tail black. Their wing coverts are dark chestnut with paler edges and their flight feathers dark grayish brown with chestnut-brown edges. Their throat, cheeks, and upper breast are black, their lower breast, sides and belly light chestnut, and their flanks and undertail coverts gray. Their iris is brown, their maxilla black, their mandible dark gray to black, and their legs and feet gray. Subadult males are similar to adults but with dusky flight feathers and a scattering of brown feathers on the crown.

== Distribution and habitat ==
The Rondonia bushbird was first described near the Rio Jiparana, a tributary of the Rio Madeira in the Brazilian state of Rondônia. Since then it has been documented at additional sites between the rios Madeira and Sucunduri to its east in the state of Amazonas, and also in Mato Grosso. It primarily inhabits lowland humid terra firme forest in locations with tangles of vines, a dense understory, and sometimes with Guadua bamboo. It has also been recorded in moderately disturbed forest and near recently logged areas, and once in campina. In elevation it is known only below 300 m (1,000 ft).

== Behavior ==
=== Movement ===
The Rondonia bushbird is believed to be a year-round resident throughout its range.

=== Feeding ===
The Rondonia bushbird feeds on insects, especially ants. It forages in vine tangles and on bamboo; on the latter it uses its bill to slit open the stem. It has also been observed apparently foraging on palm leaves. Most of the sightings have been of single birds or pairs.

=== Breeding ===
Nothing is known about the Rondonia bushbird's breeding biology.

=== Vocalization ===
The Rondonia bushbird's song is "tree-tree-tree, consisting of long sequences of regularly spaced, essentially identical whistled notes" that can be heard beyond 100 m (300 ft). Its calls include "[in alarm] a slightly chattering but relatively steady series of very slightly squeaky notes, and a single-note contact call...in a sequence of seven or eight notes".

== Status ==
The IUCN originally in 1994 assessed the Rondonia bushbird as Data Deficient, then in 2000 as Critically Endangered, in 2008 as Vulnerable, and since 2023 as Near Threatened. It has a small range and its estimated population of 2500 to 10,000 mature individuals is believed to be decreasing. The area around the type locality has been mostly cleared of forest and a hydroelectric dam has flooded much of it. Clearing for agriculture, grazing, and logging continues in other parts of Rondônia, as does dam construction. However, since about 2005 the species has been discovered in other areas. "Systematic survey works in Rondônia, Amazonas and Mato Grosso are urgently needed in order to locate any additional sites where this species may occur."
