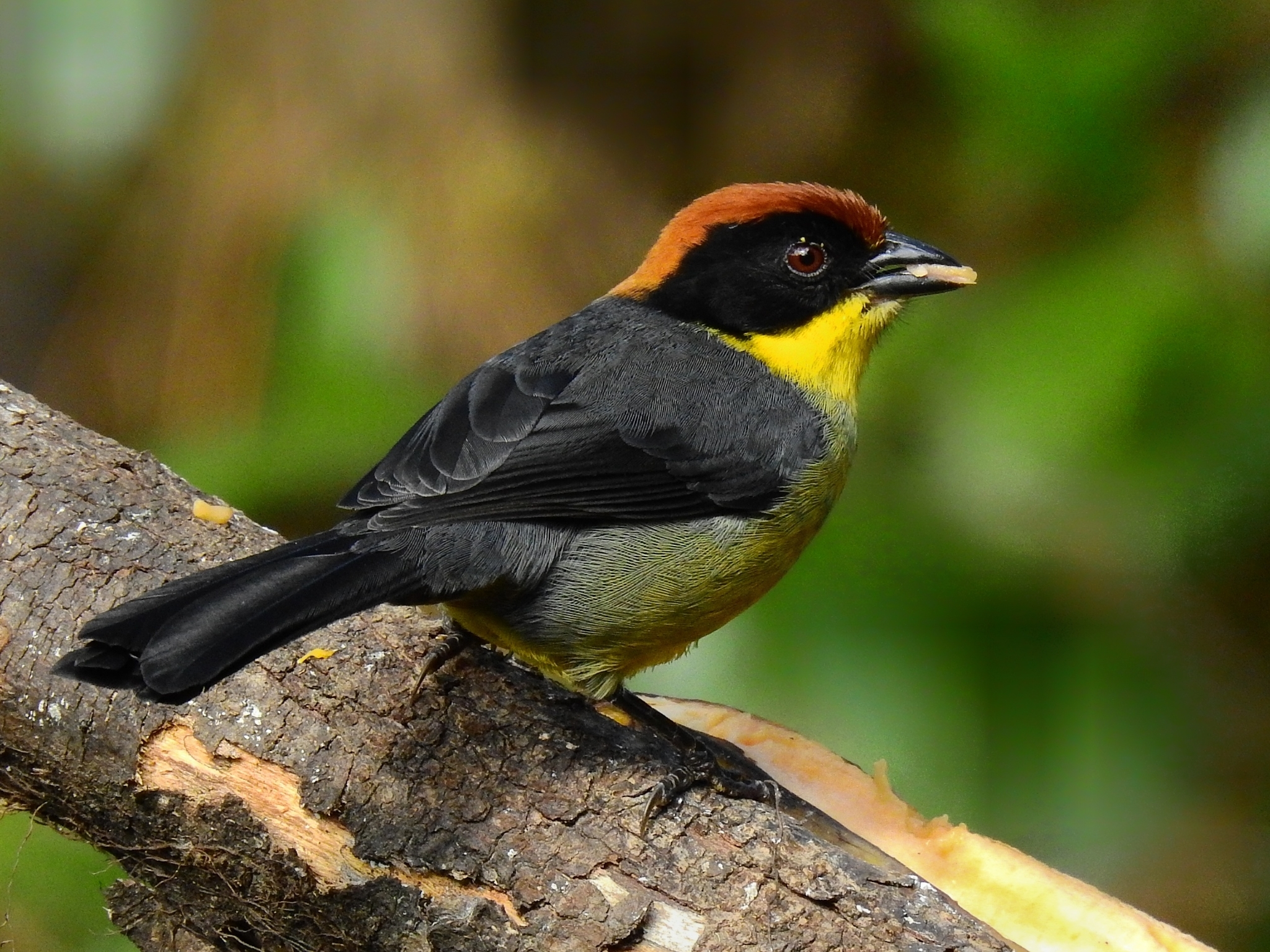

Conservation status
- Least Concern (IUCN 3.1)

Scientific classification
- Kingdom: Animalia
- Phylum: Chordata
- Class: Aves
- Order: Passeriformes
- Family: Passerellidae
- Genus: Atlapetes
- Species: A. latinuchus

Binomial name
- Atlapetes latinuchus (Du Bus de Gisignies, 1855)

Synonyms
- see text

Audio

= Yellow-breasted brushfinch =

Species of bird

The yellow-breasted brushfinch (Atlapetes latinuchus) is a species of bird in the family Passerellidae, the New World sparrows. It is found in Colombia, Ecuador, and Peru..

== Taxonomy and systematics ==
The yellow-breasted brushfinch has a complicated taxonomic history. It was formally described in 1855 with the binomial Buarremon latinuchus. During much of the twentieth century its several subspecies were treated as part of what was then called the "rufous-naped brushfinch" (A. rufinucha sensu lato). Since their separation A. rufinucha has been called the Bolivian brushfinch.

Most taxonomic systems assign the yellow-breasted brushfinch these eight subspecies:

- A. l. elaeoprorus (Sclater, PL & Salvin, 1879)
- A. l. yariguierum Donegan & Huertas, 2006
- A. l. caucae Chapman, 1927
- A. l. spodionotus (Sclater, PL & Salvin, 1879)
- A. l. comptus (Sclater, PL & Salvin, 1879)
- A. l. latinuchus (Du Bus de Gisignies, 1855)
- A. l. chugurensis Chapman, 1927
- A. l. baroni (Salvin, 1895)

However, as of February 2026 the independent South American Classification Committee retains what the other systems call the black-fronted brushfinch (A. nigrifrons) as a ninth subspecies, but is seeking a proposal to reevaluate the decision.

Some authors have called Atlapetes latinuchus the "northern rufous-naped brushfinch" or the "cloud-forest brushfinch".

== Description ==
The yellow-breasted brushfinch is about 17 cm (6.7 in) long and weighs about 16 to 31 g (0.56 to 1.1 oz). The sexes have the same plumage. Adults of the nominate subspecies A. l. latinuchus have a rufous to orange-rufous stripe from the forehead to the nape. Their face is black with a wide yellow lower cheek and a thin black line below it. Their upperparts are dark slate gray. Their wings are slightly blacker with white bases on the primaries. Their tail is blackish with olive feather edges. Their throat, breast, and belly are bright yellow with a slight olivaceous wash on the sides of the breast and the flanks.

The other subspecies of the yellow-breasted brushfinch differ from the nominate and each other thus:

- A. l. elaeoprorus: pale spot above the lores, greenish olive upperparts, and larger primary patch than nominate
- A. l. yariguierum: little or no dark cheek stripe, almost black upperparts, no white primary patch, and deeper olive wash on sides and flanks
- A. l. caucae: deep rufous crown, pale spot above the lores, olive-washed cheek stripe, and largest primary patch
- A. l. spodionotus: faint olive-brown cheek stripe, dark olive-brown upperparts, and little or no white on primaries
- A. l. comptus: yellow spot above the lores, thicker black cheek stripe than nominate
- A. l. baroni: slightly russet forehead, yellowish crown, little or no dark cheek stripe, and pale greenish upperparts
- A. l. chugurensis: like baroni with somewhat more grayish upperparts

All subspecies have a deep reddish brown iris, a black bill, and brownish to dusky gray legs and feet.

== Distribution and habitat ==
The yellow-breasted brushfinch has a disjunct distribution. The subspecies are found thus:

- A. l. elaeoprorus: Andes of north-central Colombia's Antioquia Department
- A. l. yariguierum Serranía de los Yariguíes in north-central Colombia's Santander Department
- A. l. caucae: Colombia's Western Andes and west slope of the southern end of the Central Andes
- A. l. spodionotus: Colombian Andes in Nariño Department and south on the eastern slope into Ecuador to Chimborazo Province
- A. l. comptus: western Andean slope from Cañar Province in south-central Ecuador south into far northern Peru's Piura Department
- A. l. latinuchus: eastern Andean slope from eastern Azuay and Loja provinces in southeastern Ecuador into northern Peru's Amazonas Department
- A. l. chugurensis: Pacific Andean slope in northwestern Peru's Cajamarca Department
- A. l. baroni: upper watershed of the Marañón River in northwestern Peru's Cajamarca and La Libertad departments

The yellow-breasted brushfinch inhabits a variety of semi-open brushy landscapes including the edges of forest, secondary forest, thickets along roads, and overgrown pastures. It is more tolerant of disturbed areas than many other brushfinches. In elevation it ranges between 1,600 and 3,600 m (5,200 and 11,800 ft) in Colombia, mostly between 1,500 and 3,200 m (4,900 and 10,500 ft) in Ecuador, and between 1,850 and 3,225 m (6,100 and 10,600 ft) in Peru.

== Behavior ==
=== Movement ===
The yellow-breasted brushfinch is a year-round resident.

=== Feeding ===
The yellow-breasted brushfinch's diet has not been studied but appears to be mostly insects and seeds. It forages in the understory in pairs or small groups, taking most food by gleaning while perched and occasionally with short sallies or hops. It seldom joins mixed-species feeding flocks but occasionally forages in loose flocks with other brushfinches.

=== Breeding ===
The yellow-breasted brushfinch's breeding season varies among the subspecies. That of A. l. elaeoprorus spans at least January to June. That of A. l. spodionotus includes August. That of A. l. latinuchus spans at least August to October. Fledglings have been noted for A. l. caucae in April and May, for A. l. comptus and A. l. spodionotus in May, for A. l. latinuchus in October, November, and May, for A. l. chugurensis in April, and for A. l. baroni in June. The species' few known nests were cups made from a wide variety of relatively coarse plant material lined with finer plant fibers. Two were respectively about 20 and 35 cm (8 and 14 in) above the ground and were well concealed in vegetation. The clutch is two eggs that are white with darker markings. One adult, thought to be the female, incubates; the one complete observation yielded a period of 16 days. Fledging occurs about 15 days after hatch and both parents provision nestlings.

=== Vocalization ===
The yellow-breasted brushfinch's dawn song is a "relatively short and simple, sweet whistled phrase that is repeated with variations every few seconds". Excited pairs give a jumbled and slightly musical series of notes. The species' calls include "a very high-pitched...very short tink or tsik" and a "high-pitched, finely modulated buzzy" tsweet.

== Status ==
The IUCN has assessed the yellow-breasted brushfinch as being of Least Concern. It has a large range; its population size is not known and is believed to be decreasing. No immediate threats have been identified. It is considered "common and conspicuous" in Colombia, "relatively common, widespread, and conspicuous" in Ecuador, and "fairly common" in Peru. "Because of its large global range, moderate to high level of abundance, and adaptability to disturbed habitats, this species is considered not to be at any immediate risk."

== Gallery ==
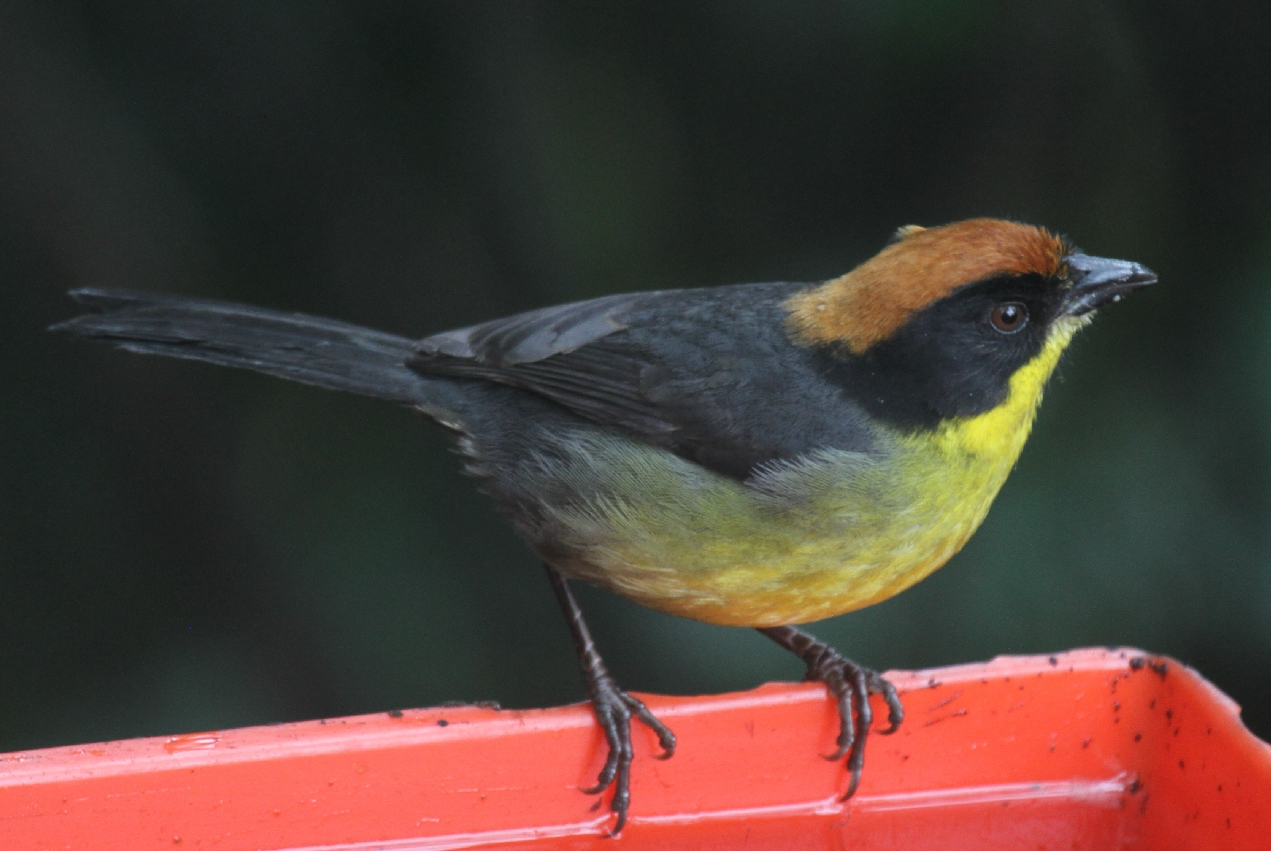
Yanachocha Reserve, Ecuador

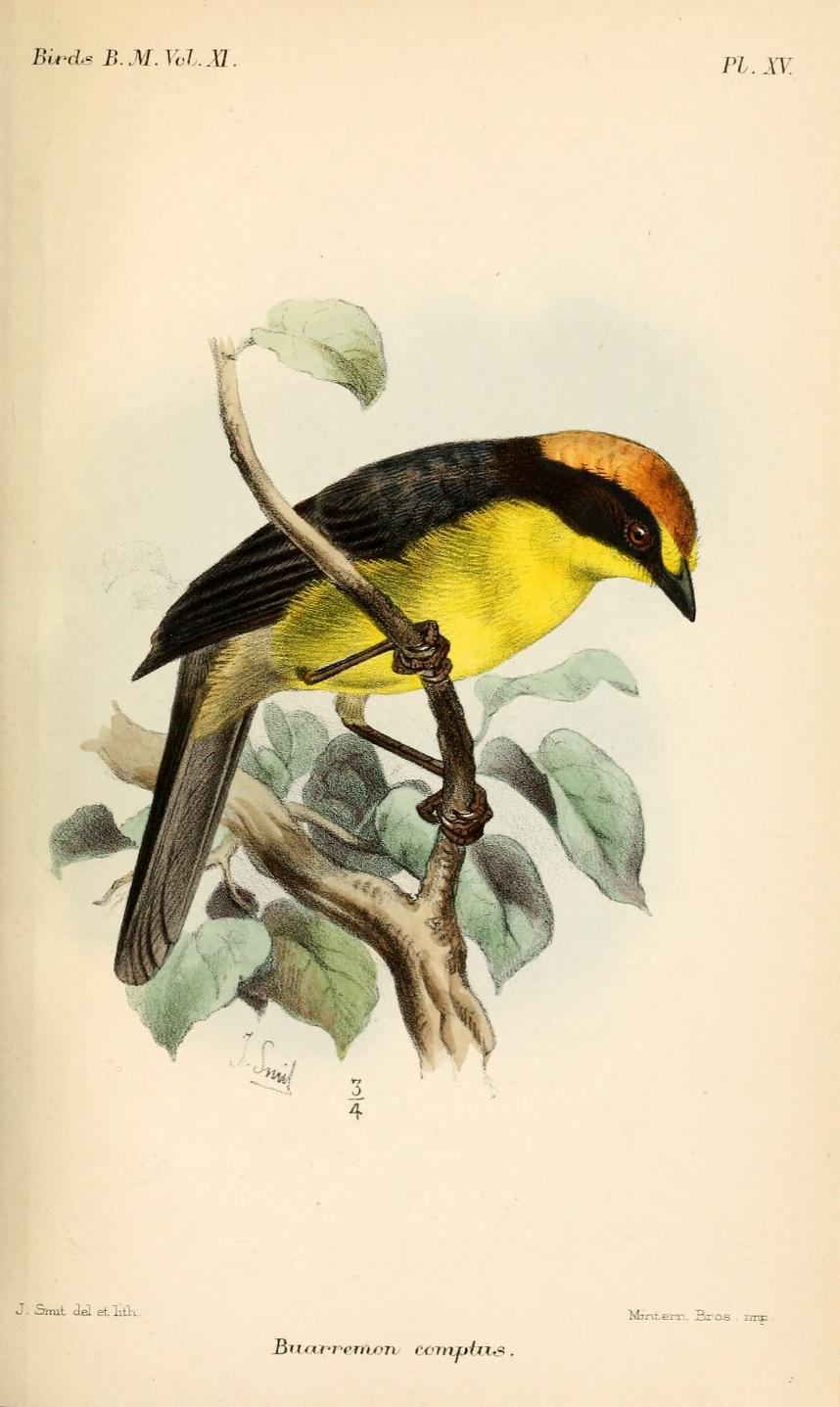
Subspecies A. l. comptus, illustration by Joseph Smit, 1886
