= American Bird Conservancy =

Non-profit organization

- Founded: 1994
- Type: 501(c)(3) non-profit organization
- Purpose: Conserving wild birds and their habitats throughout the Americas.
- Location: The Plains, Virginia, United States.
- Region served: Western Hemisphere
- Key people: Michael J. Parr, President
- Revenue: $29.8 million (2023)
- Website: abcbirds.org

The American Bird Conservancy (ABC) is a non-profit membership organization with the mission of conserving wild birds and their habitats throughout the Americas.

ABC is the second BirdLife International partner in the United States and works in cooperation with other groups and agencies, including the Bird Conservation Alliance, Partners in Flight, and the North American Bird Conservation Initiative.

== Programs and projects ==
=== Latin America ===
In Latin America, the American Bird Conservancy works with partner groups such as Fundación ProAves to purchase land that protects endangered bird habitats. They are also working with partner organizations to reduce the conversion of coffee farms that offer habitat to the cerulean warbler, by helping growers market premium beans as cerulean warbler-friendly. In Colombia they have helped to protect wintering bird habitats by partnering with Fundación ProAves to help create the first preserve dedicated to a single U.S. migrant, the Cerulean Warbler Bird Reserve. Also in Colombia, they helped fund an expedition in 2010 that discovered two nesting colonies of the endangered Baudó oropendola, one of the rarest birds in the world with less than a dozen known birds before the discovery.

=== United States ===
Several organizations, including the American Bird Conservancy and the United States Geological Survey, were commissioned by the U. S. Federal Government to study the US State of Birds in 2009. They found that 800 species of birds in the U.S. were "endangered, threatened or in significant decline", with more birds threatened in the state of Hawaii than any other region. The study found that 39% of ocean birds were declining in population. They also learned that conservation efforts are very effective at helping bird populations to recover, with positive increases in some wetland bird species due to wetland conservation.

In the U.S., they are trying to stop mountaintop mining in the Appalachias in order to protect vital breeding habitat. In 1996, after American Bird Conservancy threatened to sue the U.S. Navy over the San Clemente loggerhead shrike (Lanius ludovicicanus mearnsi) whose habitat was formerly used by the Navy for bombardment training, the Navy agreed to take steps to protect the species and its habitat.

Cats Indoors is a public education campaign by American Bird Conservancy to encourage control of cats in order to protect birds from predation by cats. The objective of the Conservancy's campaign is that all domestic cats should be contained or leashed when outdoors or kept indoors.

ABC believes that climate change is a critical threat to birds. Recognizing this fact, ABC supports renewable energy, including wind energy, and the transition away from fossil fuels. However, not every wind project is proposed in a suitable location. Some projects — sited in major bird migration routes or stopover sites — threaten huge numbers of birds. Some areas of the country are better suited to the development of wind energy than others. ABC has provided a wind risk assessment map to help identify these places.
