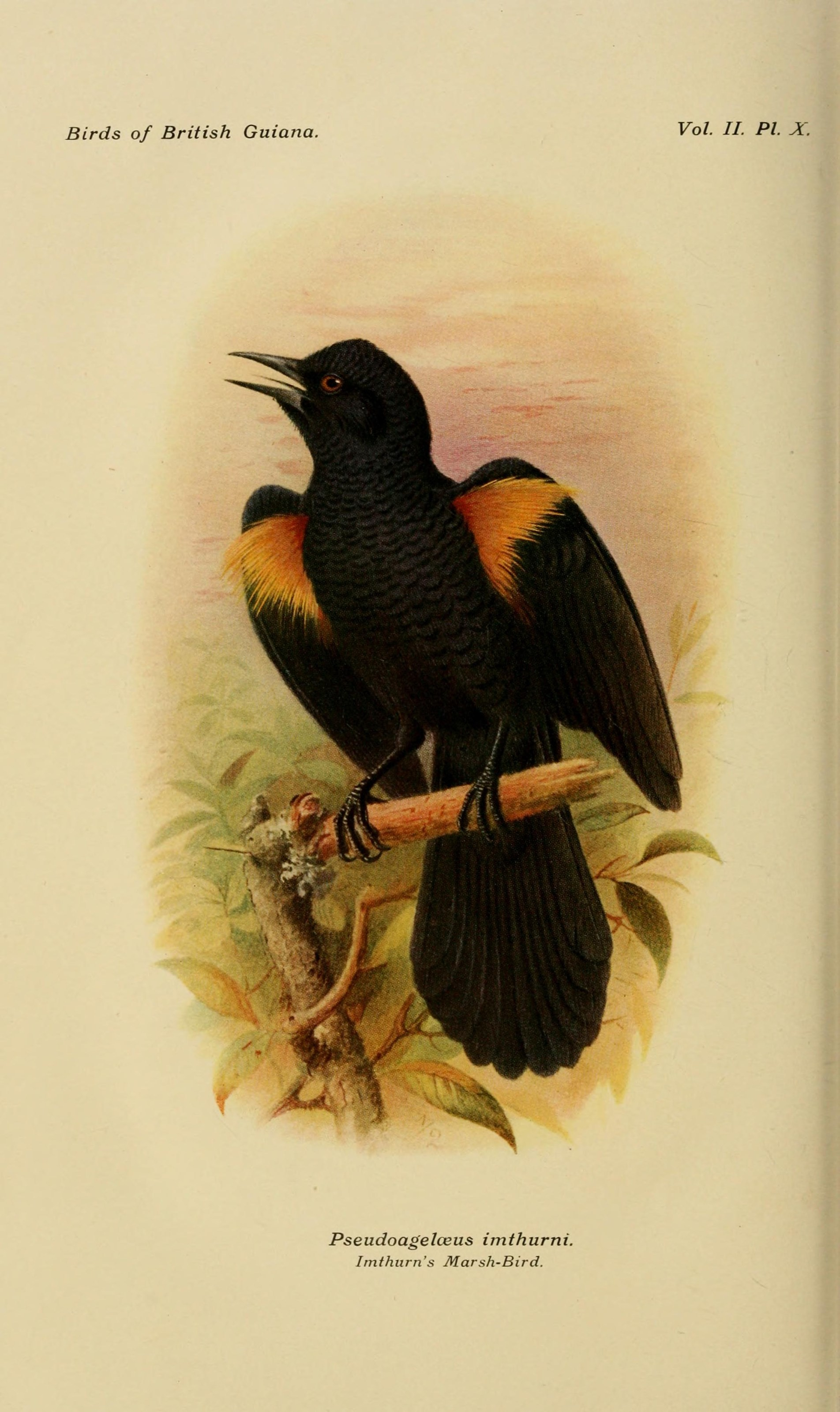
- Illustration by Henrik Grönvold, 1921

Conservation status
- Least Concern (IUCN 3.1)

Scientific classification
- Kingdom: Animalia
- Phylum: Chordata
- Class: Aves
- Order: Passeriformes
- Family: Icteridae
- Genus: Macroagelaius
- Species: M. imthurni

Binomial name
- Macroagelaius imthurni (PL Sclater, 1881)

= Golden-tufted mountain grackle =

Species of bird

The golden-tufted mountain grackle (Macroagelaius imthurni), also known as the golden-tufted grackle and tepui mountain-grackle, is a species of bird in the family Icteridae, the oropendolas, New World orioles, and New World blackbirds. It is found in Brazil, Guyana, and Venezuela.

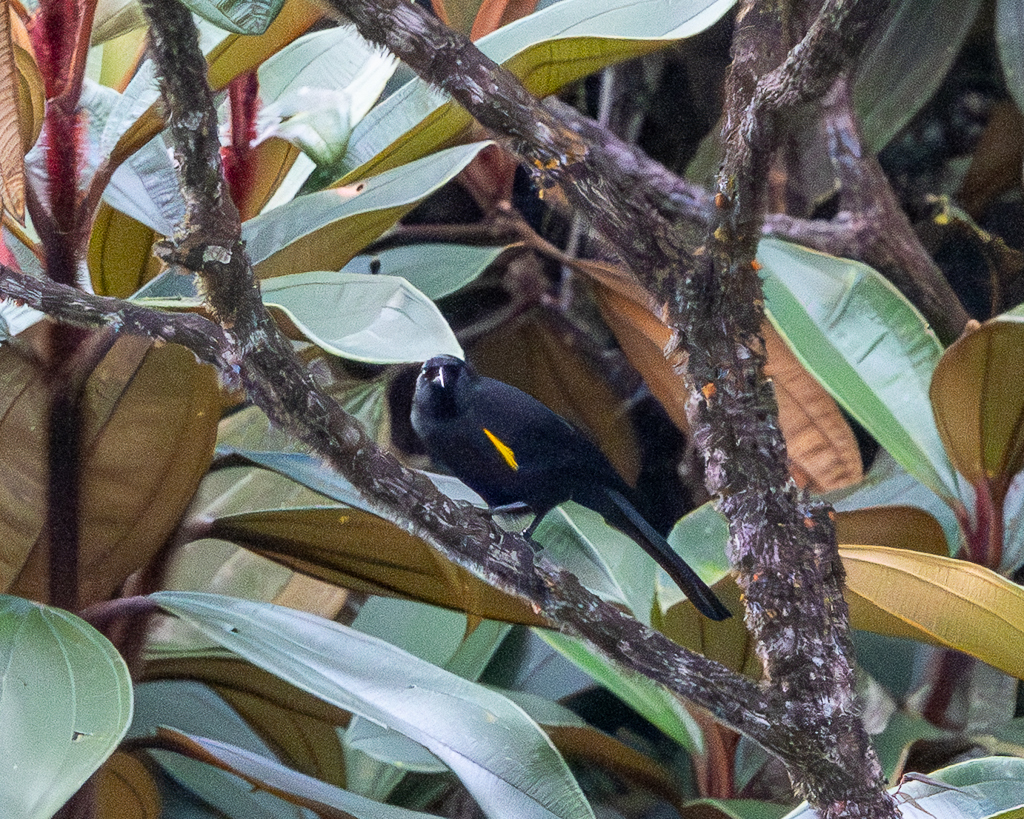
In Venezuela

== Taxonomy and systematics ==
The golden-tufted mountain grackle was formally described in 1881 with the binomial Agelaeus imthurni. Some early twentieth century authors treated it and what is now the Colombian mountain grackle (M. subalaris) as conspecific. They are now the only members of genus Macroagelaius and form a superspecies.

The golden-tufted mountain grackle is monotypic.

== Description ==
Male golden-tufted mountain grackles are about 28 cm (11 in) long and females about 25 cm (9.8 in). Males weigh an average of about 87 g (3.1 oz) and females about 72 g (2.5 oz). The species is slender and has a long tail. The sexes have the same plumage. Adults are almost entirely black overlain with a blue gloss, though their rump and underparts' plumage are less glossy. Their underwing coverts are black. Their axillaries are yellow to tawny-yellow with some chestnut at their base. These provide the eponymous pectoral tufts that are highly visible in flight but are often hidden when the bird is perched. They have a hazel to dark brown iris, a black bill, and black legs and feet. Juveniles are dusky brown with less gloss than adults.

== Distribution and habitat ==
The golden-tufted mountain grackle has a disjunct distribution. It is found primarily in Venezuela on multiple tepuis in northern and central Amazonas and northwestern and southeastern Bolívar states. From Bolívar its range extends east onto tepuis in western Guyana and extreme northwestern Brazil's Roraima state. It inhabits humid montane evergreen forest heavy with bromeliads and epiphytes. At higher elevations it also occurs in stunted Melastomataceae forest on nutrient-poor sandy soil but still with abundant bromeliads and epiphytes. In Venezuela it ranges in elevation from 500 to 2,000 m (1,600 to 6,600 ft).

== Behavior ==
=== Movement ===
The golden-tufted mountain grackle is a sedentary year-round resident.

=== Feeding ===
The golden-tufted mountain grackle's diet has not been studied but is assumed to include insects, other arthropods, small vertebrates, and fruit. It typically forages in flocks of 10 to 30 individuals, seeking prey in arboreal foliage and epiphytes. It has not been observed feeding in the forest understory or on the ground.

=== Breeding ===
The golden-tufted mountain grackle's breeding season has not been fully defined but in Venezuela includes March. It is a cooperative breeder; one nest with three young was tended by five adults. The species' nest is a cup made from grass and other plant fibers and is typically placed high in a tree.

=== Vocal and non-vocal sounds ===
The golden-tufted mountain grackle's song is "an unusual and melodic combination of tinkling and rusty-gate squeaks, often sung in flight as well as when perched". Flocks in flight may sing a "cheerful melody of tinkling notes, e.g. kut...kutlée, E-tlit...kiew! tut...skreedle-E-churk...jerk-jerk-ET!... and so on in a memorable performance". One call, which might be an alarm signal, is "a repeated chak". In flight its wings make a whistle.

== Status ==
The IUCN has assessed the golden-tufted mountain grackle as being of Least Concern. Its population size is not known and is believed to be decreasing. No immediate threats have been identified. It is considered fairly common in Venezuela. Another source calls it "[l]ocally abundant in appropriate habitat" and notes that it occurs in several national parks.
