= Fundación ProAves =

Colombian nonprofit environmental organization

- Founded: 1998
- Type: registered charity
- Location: Rio Negro, Antioquia, Colombia
- Region served: Colombia
- Website: proaves.org

The Fundación ProAves is a nonprofit environmental organization in Colombia established in 1998. Its primary aims are to protects birds of conservation concern and their habitats across Colombia.

ProAves has over 60 full-time professional staff. Its 21 conservation programs have resulted in the creation of the largest private reserve system to protect endangered species in the country (28 strategic bird reserves protecting 42,000 acres (170 km^{2}) and 68% of all threatened birds in Colombia). Its achievements include significant reforestation efforts, the management of a national bird banding and monitoring program (285,000 records, 90,000 birds banded), management of three community properties that adjoin reserves through municipality agreements, the establishment of the first Colombian conservation easement, discovery of three bird species new to science, the establishment of three national, annual environmental awareness campaigns (Palm Sunday, Migratory Bird Festival and Paujil Bird Festival), and the establishment of a network of 10 local ecological groups called "Amigos de las Aves".

Principal areas Fundación ProAves is working to conserve include Serranía de las Yariguies, Serranía de los Churumbelos, Serranía de las Quinchas, the Pacific slope of Nariño, Sierra Nevada de Santa Marta, and the department of Antioquia.

Bird reserves owned, managed or supported by Fundación ProAves include:

- Reinita Cerúlea, 1300 ha
- Chincherry
- El Paujil, 1200 ha
- El Dorado, 728 ha
- Colibri del Sol, 2852 ha
- El Mirador, 2230 ha
- El Pangán, 4844 ha
- Loro Orejiamarillo, 300 ha
- Mirabilis-Swarovsky, 1900 ha

== See also ==
- American Bird Conservancy
