= Yarigui people =

Extinct indigenous Colombian tribe

Yariguí
Total population
- extinct

Regions with significant populations
- Colombia

Languages
- Yariguí language, one of the Carib languages

The Yariguí people were an Indigenous Colombian tribe that gave their name to a mountainous area they once inhabited in the Andean cloud forest. It has been said that they committed mass suicide instead of submitting to Spanish colonial rule.

== Territory ==
The Indigenous nation of the Yariguies was located in an extensive forested area of the Magdalena River Valley, in the western portion of the current department of Santander in Colombia.

The approximate boundaries of their Indigenous territory were the Minero River to the south, the Sogamoso River to the north, the Magdalena River to the west, and the Cordillera Oriental to the east. They lived, then, in a region of woodland and rainforest, a land of high temperatures and great humidity, which made life difficult for the inhabitants.

== Language and culture ==
Belonging to the Carib language family, the Yariguies were a people formed essentially of nomadic hunters and gatherers. They were divided into five independent clans: the Arayas, Chiracotas, Tolomeos, Suamacaes, Opones, and Carares. Each clan was independently governed by its own cacique.

== History ==
From first contact with Spanish explorers, the Yariguies were hostile and presented a strong resistance. They impeded the invaders' penetration into their lands, aided by the natural difficulties of the rainforest. The chroniclers, like friar Pedro Simón, referred to the Yariguies, using their macanas, arrows, poisoned darts, and surprise tactics to reduce the 16th-century army of Gonzalo Jiménez de Quesada from 900 to 169 men.

By 1570, four Yariguí caciques were known to the Spaniards: Beto of the Arayas, Caciquillo of the Opones, Martinillo of the Carares, and Suamacá of the los Suamacaes, all dedicated to attacking the expeditions on the Magdalena, Sogamoso, Carare, and Opón rivers that transported colonists, militias, and merchants to Vélez and Santafé de Bogotá. They also attacked troops sent to hunt down natives.

The cacique Pipatón (he was the husband of cacica Yarima) offered the most famous resistance, having been captured and maimed by having his heels cut in 1601, after which he escaped and returned to lead the resistance against the Spanish. Nonetheless, at the end of his life, he turned himself in to the colonial authorities and was sent to a convent of friars in Bogotá, where he died after 1612.

Three circumstances combined to weigh against the Yariguies' desires to keep their land free from intrusion: their low birthrate, the increasing number of colonists, and the diseases brought by Europeans, especially the flu, smallpox, and measles, against which the natives had no immunological defenses. These factors caused the population of indigenous peoples to decline drastically over the 17th and 18th centuries.

== Population decline ==
At the moment of the Spanish arrival in 1536, the Yariguies are estimated to have comprised a population of some 50,000 persons. Three centuries later 15,000 still survived. Until that date, the woodland and rainforest that made up their landbase was for the most part intact. By 1880, the Yariguies numbered 10,000, then 5,000 in 1900, 1,000 in 1910, 500 in 1920, and none in 1940. The blame for the final extinction of this community is due to the new mestizo colonists who invaded their territory in search of pastureland, quinine, tagua, wood, and, ultimately, petroleum. Additionally, the construction of a road from Socorro, then capital of Santander, to the Magdalena River, brought further incursions into the region and authorized "hunting parties" against the indigenous peoples, destroying whole villages.

== See also ==
- Muisca
- Muzo
- Guane
- Yariguies Brush-finch
