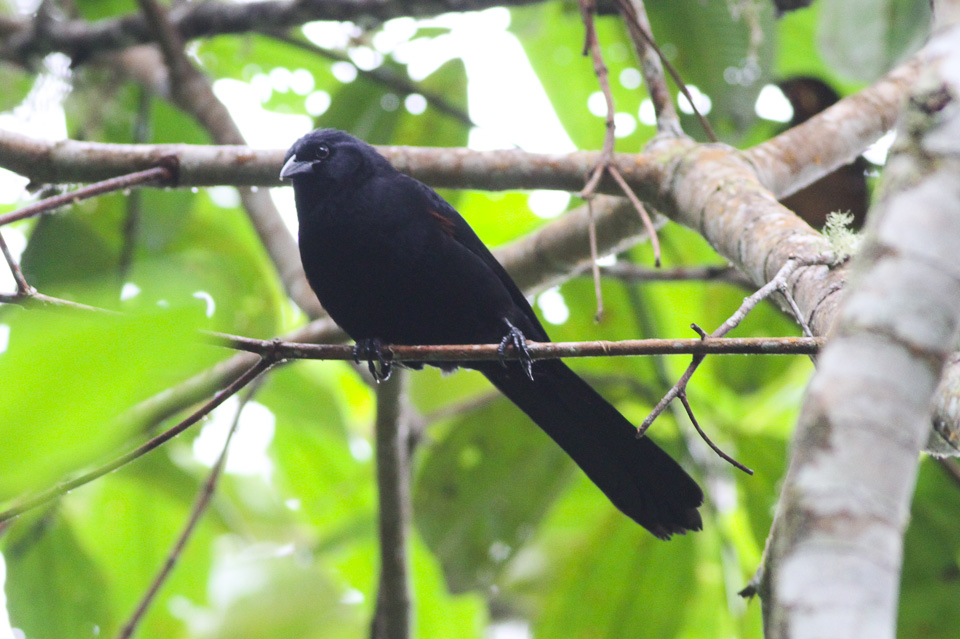
- Colombian mountain grackle (Macroagelaius subalaris)

Scientific classification
- Kingdom: Animalia
- Phylum: Chordata
- Class: Aves
- Order: Passeriformes
- Family: Icteridae
- Genus: Macroagelaius; Cassin, 1866

Type species
- Quiscalus subalaris Boissonneau, 1840

= Macroagelaius =

Genus of birds

Macroagelaius is a genus of bird in the family Icteridae. It contains the following species:

Genus Macroagelaius – Cassin, 1866 – two species
Common name	Scientific name and subspecies	Range	Size and ecology	IUCN status and estimated population
Golden-tufted mountain grackle	Macroagelaius imthurni (PL Sclater, 1881)	Brazil, Guyana, and Venezuela	Size: Habitat: Diet:	LC
Colombian mountain grackle	Macroagelaius subalaris (Boissonneau, 1840)	Colombia	Size: Habitat: Diet:	LC
