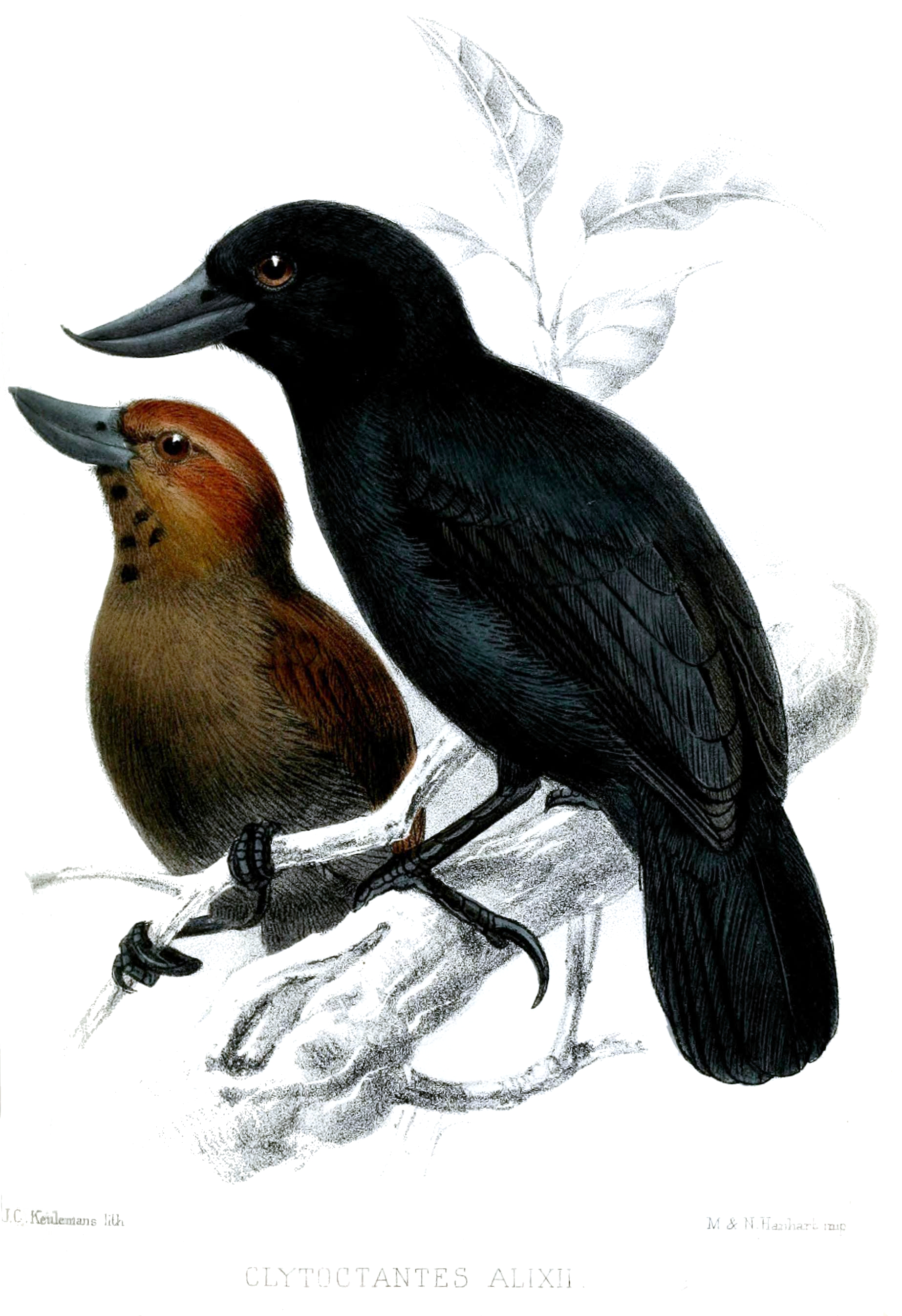

Conservation status
- Endangered (IUCN 3.1)

Scientific classification
- Kingdom: Animalia
- Phylum: Chordata
- Class: Aves
- Order: Passeriformes
- Family: Thamnophilidae
- Genus: Clytoctantes
- Species: C. alixii

Binomial name
- Clytoctantes alixii Elliot, 1870

= Recurve-billed bushbird =

Species of bird

The recurve-billed bushbird (Clytoctantes alixii) is an Endangered species of Thamnophilid antbird that inhabits dense stands of secondary vegetation at the northern end of the Andes in Colombia and Venezuela. It is named for its extraordinary bill, which curves upwards. Until 2007, the bird was almost unknown in life and apart from earlier specimens it had only been seen in life once at an army ant swarm in Colombia in 1965.

== Discovery and rediscovery ==
The species was first described in 1870 by Daniel Giraud Elliot from a specimen obtained from the Rio Napo. He named the species after Dr. Edouard Alix (1823–1893) of Paris.

A significant effort in Colombia failed to find the bird. However, in April 2004 the species was found in Venezuela in the foothills of Sierra de Perijá close to the border with Colombia, during a Conservation International-financed Rapid Assessment (RAP) expedition consisting of ornithologists Miguel Lentino, Jorge Perez-Eman, Irving Carreño and Chris Sharpe working under the auspices of the Venezuela Audubon Society and the Phelps Ornithological Collection. The first photographs were taken of a pair of birds. Four months later the first sound recordings were made and behavioral notes taken by British ornithologist Chris Sharpe.

Working in parallel, Colombian ornithology student Oscar Laverde rediscovered bushbirds in Norte de Santander, Colombia in July 2005. The birds were subsequently studied in detail by Laverde, F. Gary Stiles and ornithology students of the Natural Sciences Institute of the National University of Colombia. Their findings are published in issue No. 5 of Ornitología Colombiana. They are better located using their call which is made up of four short whistling notes.

The first published photos of the species were circulated in June 2007 from images taken by Fundacion ProAves at a new reserve in Colombia to protect this species.

== Taxonomy and systematics ==
The recurve-billed bushbird is monotypic. It shares genus Clytoctantes with the Rondonia bushbird (C. atrogularis).

== Description ==
The recurve-billed bushbird is 16 to 17 cm (6.3 to 6.7 in) long. It is rather stocky with a short tail. Its large bill is pale horn; it is laterally compressed and the mandible is upturned. The sexes have different plumage. Adult males are generally dark gray, with a white patch between their shoulders. Their lores, throat, and the center of their upper breast are black. Their wing coverts have small black spots and their flight feathers are brownish black. Adult females have a dark rufous-brown crown, back, and rump. Their wings and tail are blackish with pale rufous tips on the wing coverts. Their underparts are reddish brown that is darker on their flanks and undertail coverts. Subadult males are dark yellowish and blackish brown; their forehead, sides of the head, and throat are reddish yellow-brown and their wing coverts have white dots.

== Distribution and habitat ==
The recurve-billed bushbird is known from a few sites in Venezuela's Sierra de Perijá and in the Colombian departments of Antioquia, Norte de Santander, and Santander. It was formerly much more widespread. The species inhabits dense undergrowth in the understory and edges of evergreen forest, clearings in the forest that are regenerating, and nearby secondary forest. In one Colombian area it is associated with bamboo. In elevation it ranges between 300 and 1,200 m (1,000 and 3,900 ft) in Venezuela. In Colombia it is mostly found between 200 and 1,000 m (700 and 3,300 ft) but occurs as high as 1,150 m (3,800 ft).

== Behavior ==
=== Movement ===
The recurve-billed bushbird is thought to be a year-round resident throughout its range.

=== Feeding ===
The recurve-billed bushbird apparently feeds mostly on insects. It has been observed seeking prey by pecking open and pulling strips from stems, and at least once has been seen attending an army ant swarm. It has not been observed as part of a mixed-species feeding flock.

=== Breeding ===
The recurve-billed bushbird has been reported to breed in April and May in the western part of its range but breeding may start as early as January. Nothing else is known about its breeding biology.

=== Vocalization ===
The recurve-billed bushbird's vocalization is a "loud, mid-range whistling peeeuw peeeuw peeuw-pweet-pweet-pweet.

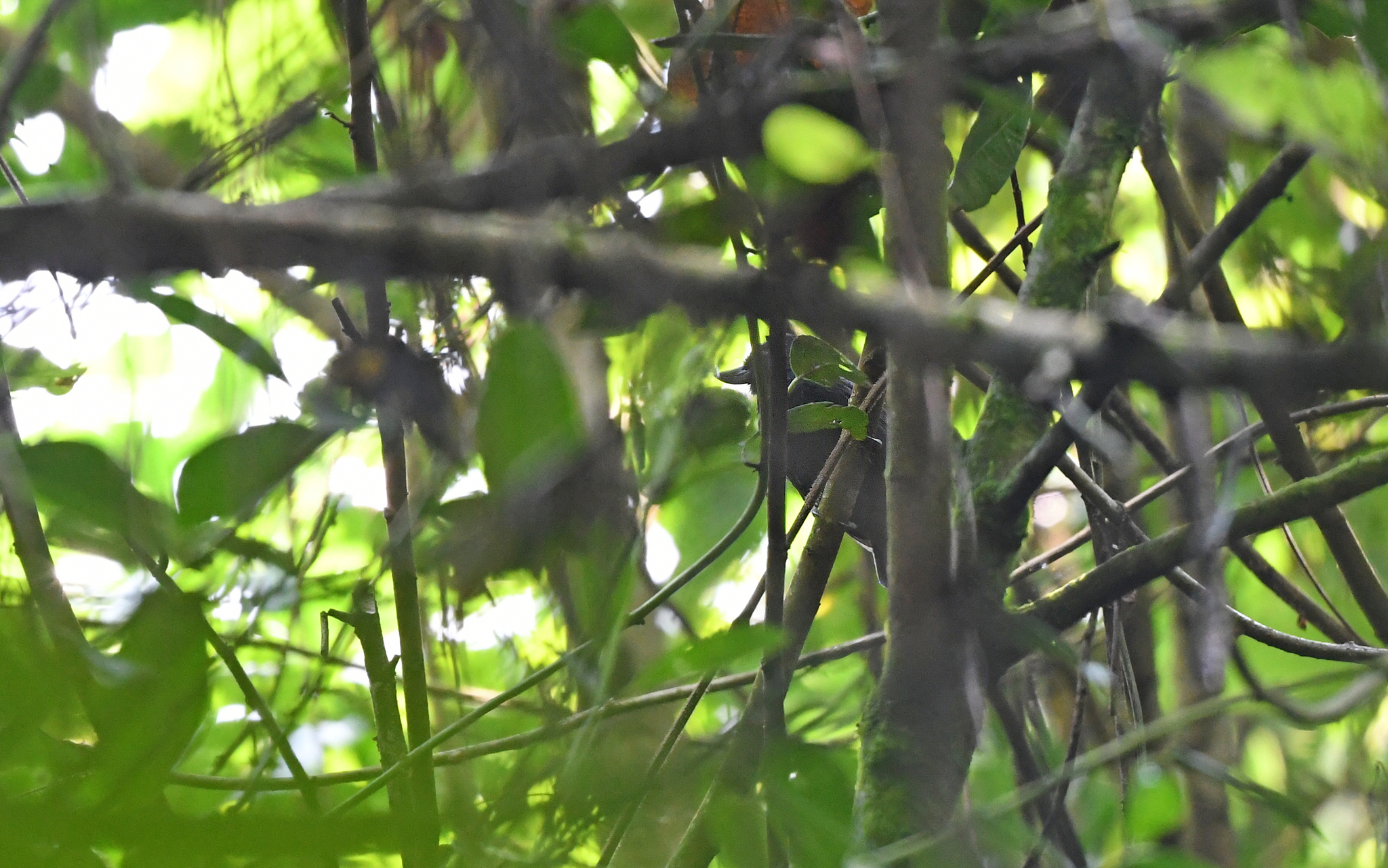
Live bird

== Status ==
The IUCN originally in 1988 assessed the recurve-billed bushbird as Threatened but since 1994 has rated it Endangered. It is known from very small and widely separated locations within its former range, and its estimated population of between 150 and 700 mature individuals is believed to be decreasing. Most of the suitable habitat in its former range has been cleared for human habitation, agriculture, logging, and mining. Though it occurs in Paramillo National Park in Colombia and Sierra de Perijá National Park in Venezuela, both sites offer only nominal protection and deforestation is ongoing in both. The species might "prove to be more common and widespread than previously thought, and able to survive in secondary landscapes, but at present its ecological requirements are unknown". It also occurs in two small privately-protected areas.

The outlook for the bushbird in the foothills of Sierra de Perijá in Venezuela seems positive, and certainly much better than scientists had guessed before 2004. The bird appears to be not uncommon in regenerating swidden ("slash-and-burn") plots. A significant area of extremely important, uninhabited primary forest is being rapidly invaded in the foothills of this range where the forest is being felled to plant short-term cash crops. There appears to be little attempt to control or regulate illegal deforestation there by the Venezuelan government and local political support for the invasion. Despite the long-term consequences for the survival of the forest and its species, in the short term this may lead to creation of further bushbird habitat.

The bushbird should now be looked for in suitable area elsewhere. Sierra de Perijá is one of the top conservation priorities for birds in Venezuela, not just for this species but for several other threatened birds.
