= San Vicente de Chucurí =

Coordinates: 6°53′N 73°25′W

- Municipality and town
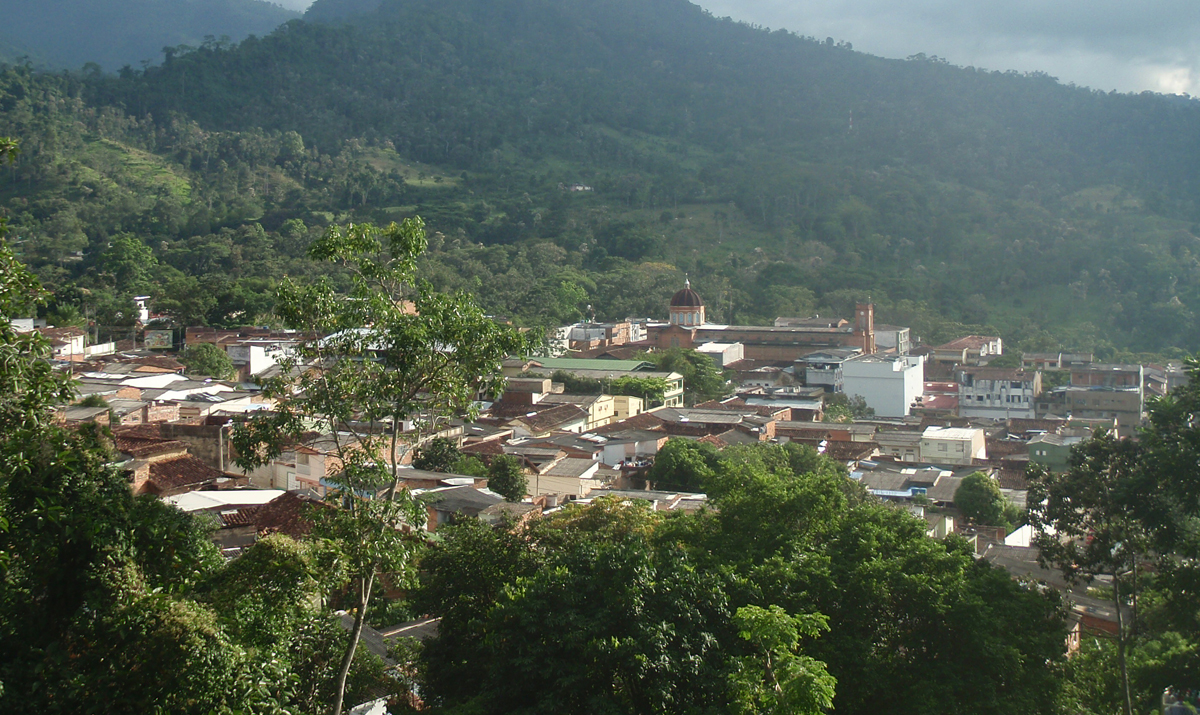
- View of San Vicente de Chucurí

- Flag Coat of arms

- Location of the municipality and town of San Vicente de Chucurí in the Santander Department of Colombia.
- Country: Colombia
- Department: Santander Department

Population (2020 est.)
  - Total: 35,232
- Time zone: UTC-5 (Colombia Standard Time)

San Vicente de Chucurí is a town and municipality in the Santander Department in northeastern Colombia. Famous for its cocoa, San Vicente was embroiled in the armed conflict of the 1980s.
