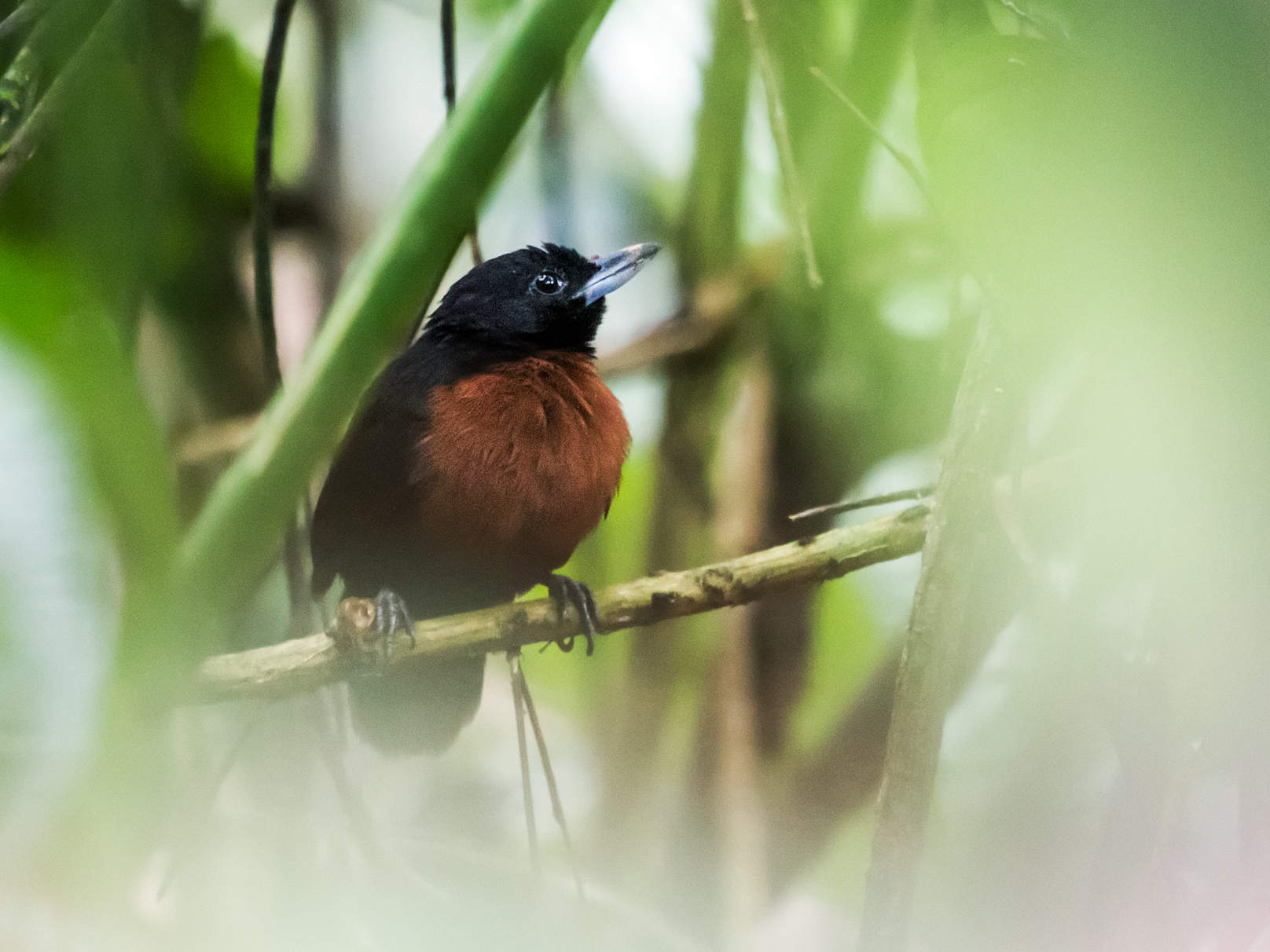
- female
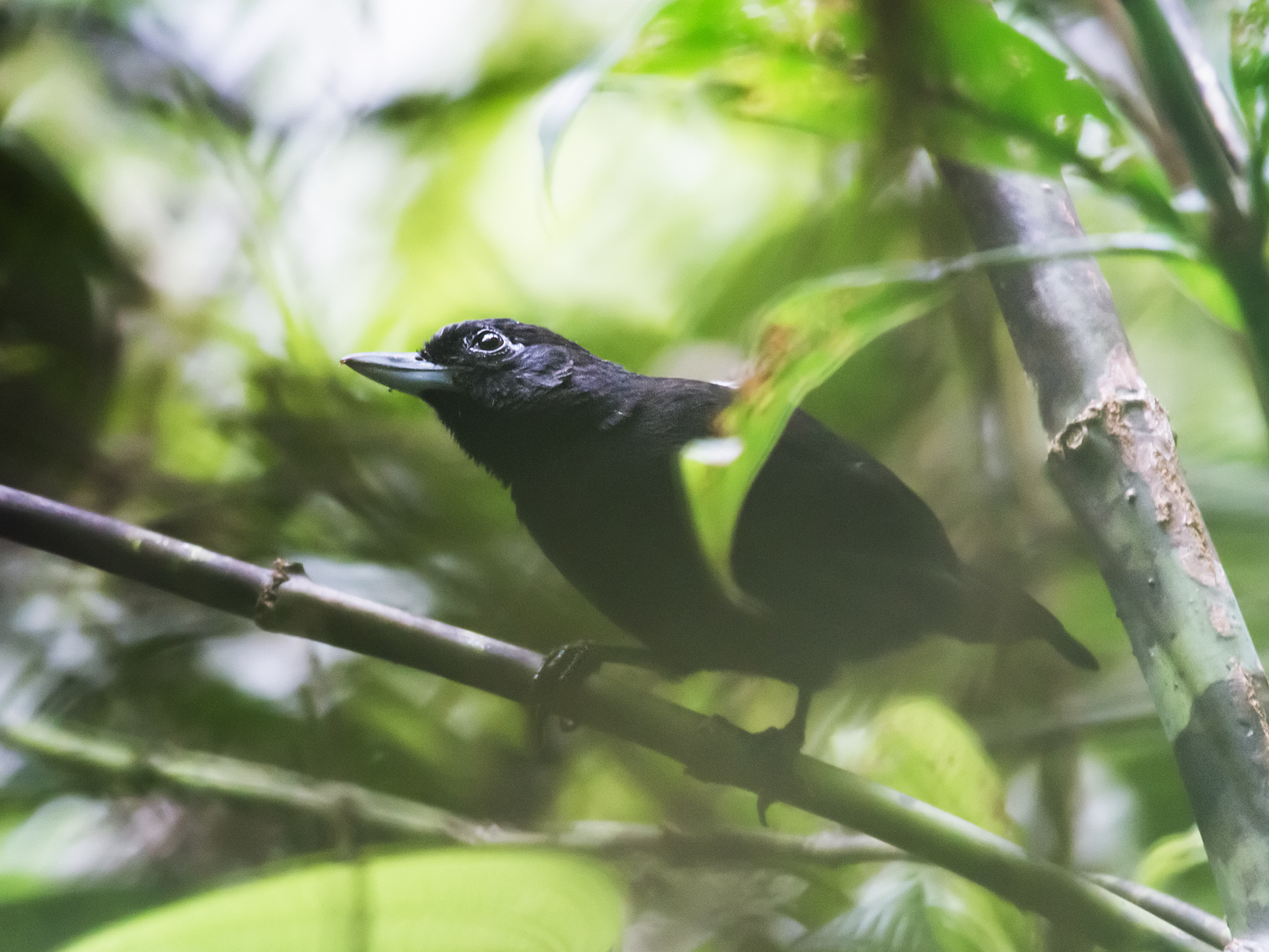
- male

Conservation status
- Least Concern (IUCN 3.1)

Scientific classification
- Kingdom: Animalia
- Phylum: Chordata
- Class: Aves
- Order: Passeriformes
- Family: Thamnophilidae
- Genus: Neoctantes; P.L. Sclater, 1869
- Species: N. niger

Binomial name
- Neoctantes niger (Pelzeln, 1859)

= Black bushbird =

Species of bird

The black bushbird (Neoctantes niger) is a species of bird in subfamily Thamnophilinae of family Thamnophilidae, the "typical antbirds". It is found in Brazil, Colombia, Ecuador, and Peru.

== Taxonomy and systematics ==
The black bushbird was described by the Austrian ornithologist August von Pelzeln in 1859 and given the binomial name Xenops niger. The current genus Neoctantes was erected by the English zoologist Philip Sclater in 1869.

The black bushbird is the only member of genus Neoctantes and has no subspecies.

== Description ==
The black bushbird is 15 to 16 cm (5.9 to 6.3 in) long and weighs 29 to 32 g (1.0 to 1.1 oz). It is rather stocky with a short tail and an unusual upturned bill. The sexes have different plumage. Adult males are entirely black except for a small, mostly hidden, patch of white between the shoulders. Adult females are mostly sooty black with a rufous breast and upper belly.

== Distribution and habitat ==
The black bushbird has a disjunct distribution. The largest range encompasses south-central and southeastern Colombia, eastern Ecuador, northeastern and southeastern Peru, and western Brazil. Isolated ranges are scattered throughout central Amazonian Brazil. The species inhabits lowland terra firme and várzea evergreen forest; it is more common in the latter. It favors dense undergrowth along edges, in treefalls, and along swampy streams.

== Behavior ==
=== Movement ===
The black bushbird is a year-round resident throughout its range.

=== Feeding ===
The black bushbird is thought to feed on insects and other arthropods. It forages singly or in pairs in dense vegetation from the ground up to about 10 m (35 ft) above it. It occasionally joins mixed-species feeding flocks that pass through its territory but does not travel with them. It forages mostly by picking, hammering, and digging into branches, woody vines, and rotten wood. It uses its unusual bill to wedge or flake off bark or pieces of the substrate.

=== Breeding ===
Only one nest of the black bushbird has been studied. It was found in September in Peru, a messy, bulky cup of leaves and other plant material suspended in a shrub's branch fork. The male was incubating the single egg. The nest failed the next day due to predation or a storm so the incubation period, time to fledging, and other details of parental care could not be determined. Nothing else is known about the species' breeding biology.

=== Vocalization ===
The black bushbird is not highly vocal. Its song is an "often slightly rising series of semimusical 'werk' notes" given for a minute or more at about one note per second. Its call is "distinctive, squealing, two-parted but continuous, with second part lower-pitched", a "nasal 'kyoo' ".

== Status ==
The IUCN has assessed the black bushbird as being of Least Concern. It has a very large range; its population size is not known and is believed to be decreasing. No immediate threats have been identified. It is not well known and considered rare to locally uncommon, but its numbers may be underestimated due to its secretive habits. "Much of the range of this species is relatively inaccessible, with vast areas of intact habitat" and it occurs in several protected areas.
