= Yariguíes National Park =

National park in Colombia

- IUCN category II (national park)
- Location within Colombia
- Location: Santander Department, Colombia
- Nearest city: Barrancabermeja
- Coordinates: 6°33′N 73°26′W
- Area: 78,837 hectares (194,810 acres)
- Website: Parques naturales de Colombia

Yariguíes National Park (Spanish: Serranía de los Yariguíes) is a natural park in north central Colombia. It is located in the Santander department and measures 78,837 hectares (194,810 acres). It was officially designated as a national natural park in 2005.

== See also ==
- Cerulean Warbler Bird Reserve
- List of national parks of Colombia
