= SS Roanoke =

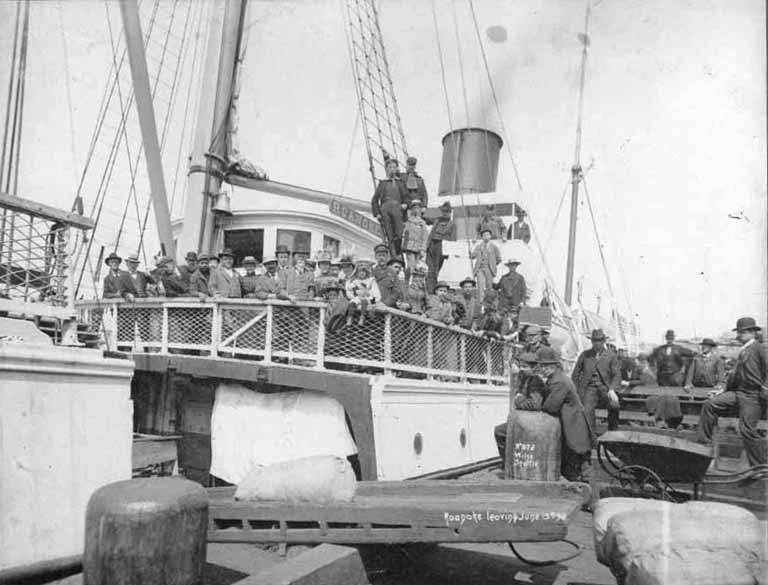
- Roanoke in Seattle, headed for the Klondike, 1898

History

United States
- Name: Roanoke
- Owner: Old Dominion Steamship Company; 1882–98; North American Transportation and Trading Company; 1898–1901; North Pacific Steamship Company; ?-1916
- Route: New York City to Norfolk, Virginia; Seattle to Nome, Alaska; San Diego to Portland, Oregon
- Builder: Delaware River Iron Shipbuilding and Engine Works (Chester, PA)
- Launched: March 1882
- In service: 1882-1916
- Out of service: 1916
- Fate: Foundered May 9, 1916

General characteristics
- Type: Coastal passenger/cargo liner
- Tonnage: 2,354 GRT, 1,654 NRT
- Length: 267.0 ft (81 m)
- Beam: 40.5 ft (12 m)
- Draft: 16.4 ft (5 m)
- Installed power: 1,900hp
- Crew: 58

SS Roanoke (1882–1916) was a passenger and cargo ship built by John Roach & Sons in Chester, Pennsylvania. The Roanoke was built for the Old Dominion Steamship Company's service from New York to Norfolk Virginia. In 1898 the ship was sold to the North American Transportation and Trading Company to take miners, supplies and gold between Seattle and ports in Alaska. Later the Roanoke was sold to the Oregon-based North Pacific Steamship Company. In 1907, the Roanoke helped to rescue the survivors of her former running mate Columbia. On May 9, 1916, the Roanoke sank in heavy seas off the California coast near San Luis Obispo with the loss of 47 lives. There were only three survivors.

== Construction ==
The Roanoke was built at the Delaware River Iron Ship Building and Engine Works of John Roach & Sons in Chester, Pennsylvania. The ship was delivered to the Old Dominion Steamship Company in March 1882, and given the name previously held by a side-wheel paddle steamer in service with the New York and Virginia Steamship Company. The earlier Roanoke had been built around 1851, and served as a troop carrier for the Union Army in the Civil War. It then ran on a commercial route from New York to Havana and New Orleans, but was captured by Confederate privateers and destroyed. The Old Dominion took over the New York and Virginia line in 1862, and resurrected the name Roanoke for one of its new iron steamers.

== Old Dominion service (1882–98) ==
Old Dominion Steamship Company ship list from the 1880s, including the Roanoke.

By 1887, the Roanoke was operating on the route from New York City to Norfolk, Virginia, and among its passengers were often European Mormon immigrants making their way to Salt Lake City, Utah. The immigrants landed in New York and were processed by New York State officials at Castle Garden Immigration Depot in Lower Manhattan. Until 1887, Mormon immigrants had traveled onwards by rail using tickets arranged by Mormon agents in New York. This changed following attempts by the Grand Trunk Line Immigration Clearing House Commission to monopolize rail travel by the immigrants and raise the fares. At the same time one of the New York Board of Commissioners of Emigration attempted to block Mormon immigration entirely. Faced with these challenges, Mormon leaders negotiated a new route for the immigrants to take. After processing at Castle Garden, immigrants took the overnight trip on one of the Old Dominion's steamers to Norfolk, from where they picked up the Norfolk and Western Railroad service. This voyage remained a primary route for Mormon emigrants until the federal government took over immigration in the state of New York on April 19, 1890. During this period, more than 5,000 Mormon emigrants in forty companies traveled on the Old Dominion line.

A newspaper report from June 21, 1889 noted that 345 of 731 passengers arriving at Castle Garden were Mormons and "they were carefully culled out from the other passengers and transferred to the Old Dominion steamship Roanoke." Mormon passengers reported that the crew of the Roanoke treated them well.

The New York officials at the dock of the Old Dominion Steamship Company were also kind and obliging, in providing against an emergency for which neither they nor us were responsible. We desire also to mention the names of Mr. J.G. Halphers (captain) and Mr. W.H. Mayor (purser) of the S.S. Roanoke, who said if we could suggest anything beyond what had already been done that would contribute to the comfort of our people, it should be attended to.

— Levi Naylor, Letter to George Teasdale

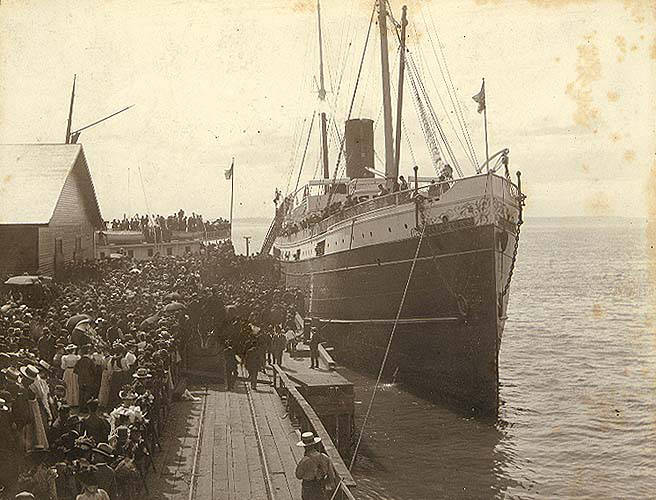
Roanoke arrives in Seattle, Washington from the Klondike, July 19, 1898, with four tons of gold.

We passed Castle Garden all right, and set sail for Norfolk on board the S.S. Roanoke at 3 p.m., and expect to arrive there about 3 o'clock on the afternoon of the 21st. The Roanoke is a fine steamer, and everything is done to make us feel comfortable. Mr. Gibson, the agent, was present himself as the boat landed, and carried everything out in first-class order. An agent has been sent with us from New York, to see that everything is attended to properly at Norfolk.

— Lars S. Anderson, Letter

In 1898, the Roanoke was sold to the Chicago-based North American Transportation and Trading Company.

== Alaska service (1898–1904) ==
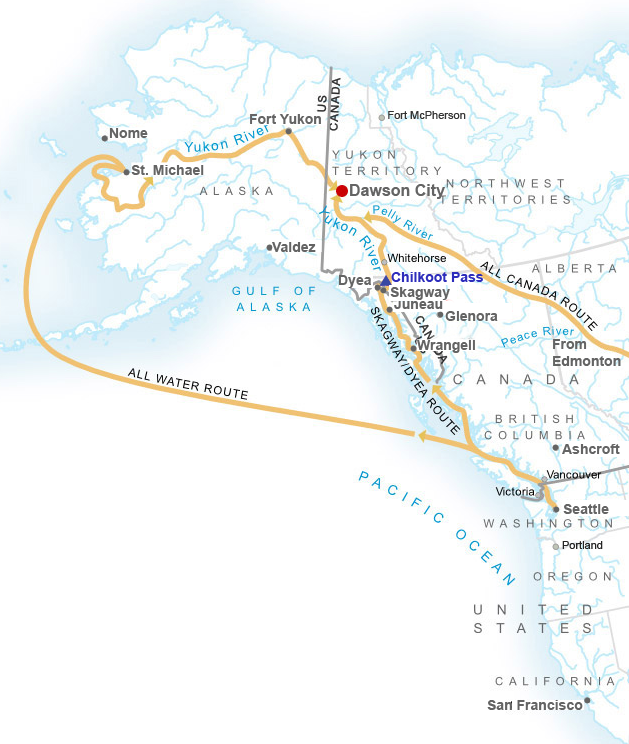
Routes to the Klondike (red spot).

Following the discovery of gold in Klondike, Yukon during 1896, the Klondike Gold Rush brought a flood of trade during 1897 to the Pacific Northwest. This boom encouraged shipping companies to bring steamers to the region for the 1898 season. The Roanoke, bound from Baltimore, was one of 17 steamers listed in the February 28, 1898 edition of the Seattle Post-Intelligencer as heading for Seattle to transport miners and their supplies to the gold fields.

There were two primary routes from Seattle to the Yukon gold fields. One was by ship to the south-east Alaskan towns of Dyea and Skagway, and then via land for 30 miles over high mountain passes from where the miners could travel down the tributaries of the Yukon River. The other route was longer and more costly but faster and less grueling: Miners would take a coastal steamer to the Yukon delta port of St. Michael, from where they could transfer to a river steamer to head up the Yukon River. The Roanoke was brought to Seattle specifically by the North American Transportation and Trading Company to serve the long coastal route to St. Michael, sometime calling at intermediate ports such as Dutch Harbor. The NATTC began advertising the Roanoke's service in March 1898.

The lead story in the July 20, 1898 edition of the Post-Intelligencer was the docking of the Roanoke in Seattle with four tons of gold from Alaska aboard. After the discovery of gold at Nome, Alaska in September 1898 precipitated the Nome Gold Rush, the Roanoke's route was modified to end at Nome. The Roanoke remained serving the Alaska route until at least June 1904. In August 1904, the Roanoke was reported to be laid up for repairs.

== Oregon and California coast (1905–16) ==
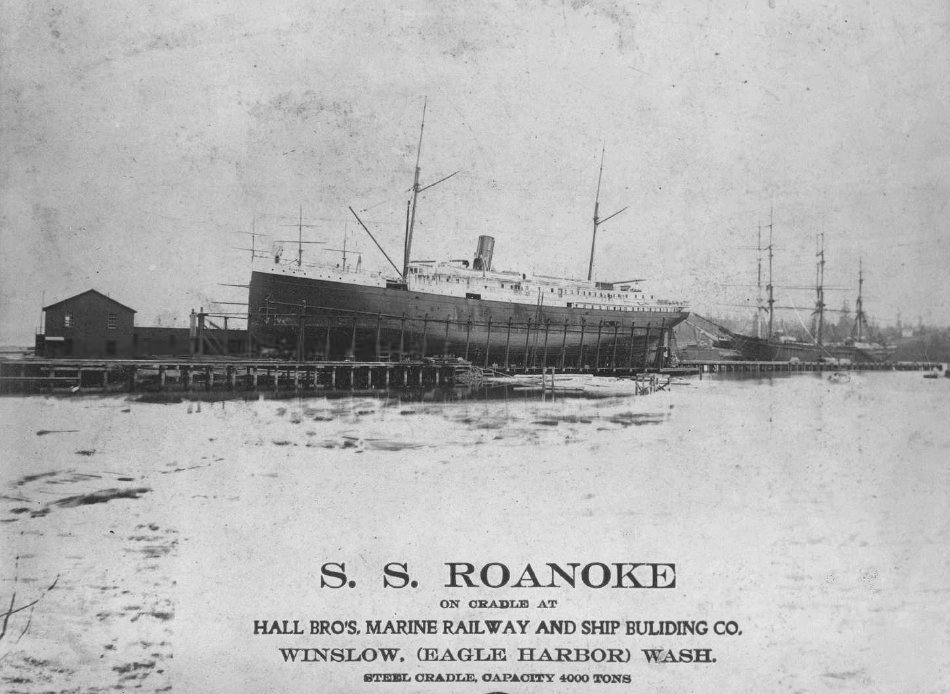
SS Roanoke on a steel cradle at the Hall Brothers Marine Railway and Ship Building Co., Eagle Harbor, Winslow, Washington

By 1905, the Roanoke was serving ports in California and Oregon. On November 27, 1905, the ship lost its rudder and stern post while crossing the harbor bar at Eureka, California in heavy seas during an ebb tide.

By 1906, the Roanoke was owned by the North Pacific Steamship Company, which also owned the George W. Elder another nightboat built for the Old Dominion Steamship Company. For the next decade, the George W. Elder and Roanoke worked the NPSC's primary route from Portland, via Eureka and San Francisco to Los Angeles.

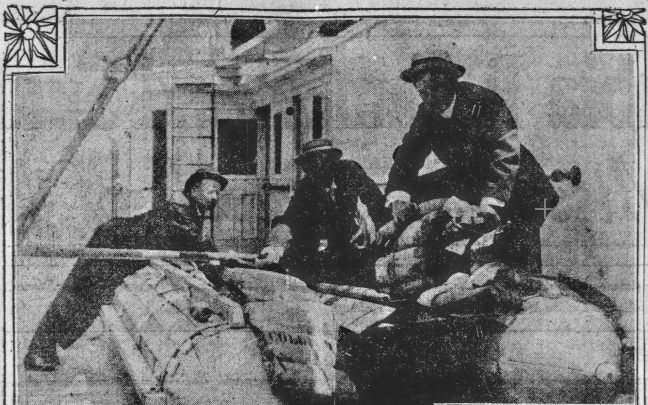
A life raft from the Columbia after being hauled aboard the Roanoke.

On July 21, 1907, the Roanoke and the George W. Elder were involved in the rescue of survivors from the Columbia, another ship from the Delaware River yard. The Columbia had collided with the lumber schooner San Pedro off Shelter Cove, California, causing the Columbia to sink, killing 88 people. Both the George W. Elder and Roanoke arrived at the site of the disaster and picked up Columbia's survivors from the badly damaged San Pedro.

== Sinking ==
By 1916, the Roanoke was under charter for service to South America. The Roanoke left San Francisco bound for Valparaíso, Chile at midnight May 8/9, 1916 with a cargo of explosives, wheat, oil and gasoline. The ship foundered in heavy seas in the Pacific Ocean off Point Buchon, California at about 3 p.m. on May 9. 47 people died and three crew members were rescued from a lifeboat that beached near San Luis Obispo, California.

== Sources ==
=== Books, web resources and journals ===
- Merchant Vessels of the United States. Department of Commerce and Labor, Bureau of Navigation. 1899. p. 285.
- Merchant Vessels of the United States. Department of Commerce and Labor, Bureau of Navigation. 1901. p. 296.
- Merchant Vessels of the United States. Department of Commerce and Labor, Bureau of Navigation. 1911. p. 280.
- Belyk, Robert C. (2001). Great Shipwrecks of the Pacific Coast. New York: Wiley. ISBN 0-471-38420-8.
- Colton, T. (October 21, 2013). "The Delaware River Iron Shipbuilding & Engine Works, Chester PA". ShipbuildingHistory. Archived from the original on October 23, 2014.
- Woods, Fred E. (1999). "Norfolk and the Mormon Folk: Latter-day Saint Immigration through Old Dominion (1887–90)" (PDF). Mormon Historical Studies. 1 (1): 73–91.

=== Newspapers ===
- "Coming to Seattle. Steamers Bound to Alaska from All Parts of the World Will Sail From this City". Seattle Post-Intelligencer. Vol. 33, no. 106. February 28, 1898. p. 10.
- "To The New El Dorado (advertisement)". Seattle Post-Intelligencer. Vol. 33, no. 109. March 3, 1898. p. 1.
- "Treasure Ship Roanoke Is In. Four Tons of Klondike Gold". Seattle Post-Intelligencer. Vol. 34, no. 65. July 20, 1898. p. 1.
- "Big Alaska Fleet Is Due". Seattle Star. July 6, 1901. p. 4.
- "Orcas Island. Doe Bay and Olga". San Juan Islander. June 11, 1904. p. 8.
- "Orcas Island. Doe Bay and Olga". San Juan Islander. August 13, 1904. p. 8.
- "Over a Bar Broadside. Steamer Roanoke Proceeded Under Steam But Badly Crippled". East Oregonian. November 28, 1905. p. 1.
- "Steamer Sinks off California Coast; 3 Survive". Seattle Star. May 11, 1916. p. 1.
- "Marine insurance market". The Times. No. 41165. London. May 12, 1916. p. 6.
- "Marine insurance market". The Times. No. 41166. London. May 13, 1916. p. 12.
