= North Pacific Steamship Company =

The North Pacific Steamship Company was a shipping company operating along the west coast of the United States and to South America during the late 19th century and early 20th century.

== History ==
The North Pacific Steamship Company was chartered in March 1869 in Oregon, with a capital of $5,000,000. The company was the successor to the California, Oregon and Mexican Steamship Company.

In 1906, the company purchased the George W. Elder, which had been launched in 1874. The company also operated the steamship Roanoke, launched in 1882. Both boats had been built as nightboats for the Old Dominion Steamship Company.

On July 21, 1907, the former running mate to the George W. Elder, the Columbia collided with the lumber schooner San Pedro off Shelter Cove, California, causing the Columbia to sink, killing 88 people. Among the dead was Captain Peter A. Doran, a former commander of the George W. Elder. Both the George W. Elder and Roanoke arrived at the site of the disaster and picked up Columbia's survivors from the badly damaged San Pedro. The George W. Elder returned some of the survivors to Astoria, Oregon. The George W. Elder also towed the San Pedro to shore, following the disaster.

During World War I, the George W. Elder was leased by the Pacific Mail Steamship Company, which was at the time owned by the Grace Line. The George W. Elder was used during this time as part of a four ship feeder service for Central American and Mexican ports.

By 1909, the NPSC was operating four ships. The George W. Elder and Roanoke worked its primary route from Portland, via Eureka and San Francisco to Los Angeles. The F.A. Kilburn ran between Eureka and San Francisco. And the Eureka operated along the Oregon coast, connecting Portland, Astoria, Coos Bay and Eureka.

By 1915, the company's fleet had expanded to eight ships. However the NPSC vessels, the largest of which could accommodate 234 passengers, were smaller and slower than the 800-person "Great Northern" and "Northern Pacific" of the Great Northern Pacific Steam Ship Company. The NPSC found a niche by supplementing service on the key Portland–San Francisco Line with stops at Santa Barbara, Los Angeles, San Diego and other smaller ports that were bypassed by the major lines.

Despite a larger fleet, the NPSC was also struggling financially due to the loss of its steamer Santa Clara on the bar of Coos Bay, Oregon, in 1914. The management considered closing the company's doors in 1915. Financial relief came when the California South Seas Navigation Company chartered both Roanoke and George W. Elder. Neither were used for passenger service under this charter.

By 1916, the NPSC fleet had shrunk to two ships, but a third was added to fill an opening left by the sale of the independently operated Aroline to H.F. Alexander in February 1916. With more capacity, the company scheduled service every five days (previously weekly) on its Southern California-to-Oregon route and added calls at Eureka and Coos Bay. The NPSC reported that although it had received offers for its ships it was committed to continuing a coastal service.

Only months later, the company again had to confront disaster. Roanoke left San Francisco bound for Valparaíso, Chile at midnight May 8/9, 1916 with a cargo of explosives, wheat, oil and gasoline. The ship foundered in heavy seas in the Pacific Ocean off Point Buchon, California at about 3 p.m. on May 9. 47 people died and three crew members were rescued from a lifeboat that beached near San Luis Obispo, California.

On May 8, 1917, Charles P. Doe sold the North Pacific Steamship Company to Thomas Crowley and Andrew Mahoney of San Francisco. Of the company's three remaining ships, the George W. Elder had been chartered for offshore cargo work, while the coastal runs between Portland and San Francisco every five days were handled by the F.A. Kilburn and the Breakwater. The new owners changed the company name to the Independent Steamship Company, which was also known as the Emerald Line. All three vessels were sold to the Mexican Fruit and Steamship Company early in 1918.

After the war, the aging George W. Elder was sold to Artigas Riolrio Compania, based in Valparaíso, Chile. It was renamed America and served the Chilean coastline until 1935. The America was reported scrapped at this time, but it remains uncertain whether the job was done in Japan or Valparaiso. Either way, the America had reached an outstanding age of 61 years.

== List of ships ==
- George W. Elder, built 1874, purchased 1906, sold 1918, scrapped 1935
- Roanoke, built 1882, operating 1909, sank May 9, 1916
- F.A. Kilburn, operating 1909, sold 1918
- Eureka, operating 1909
- Santa Clara, sank 1915
- Breakwater, built 1880, operating 1917, sold 1918
