= Mays, Washington =

Former planned community in Lewis County, Washington

- Former planned community; ghost town
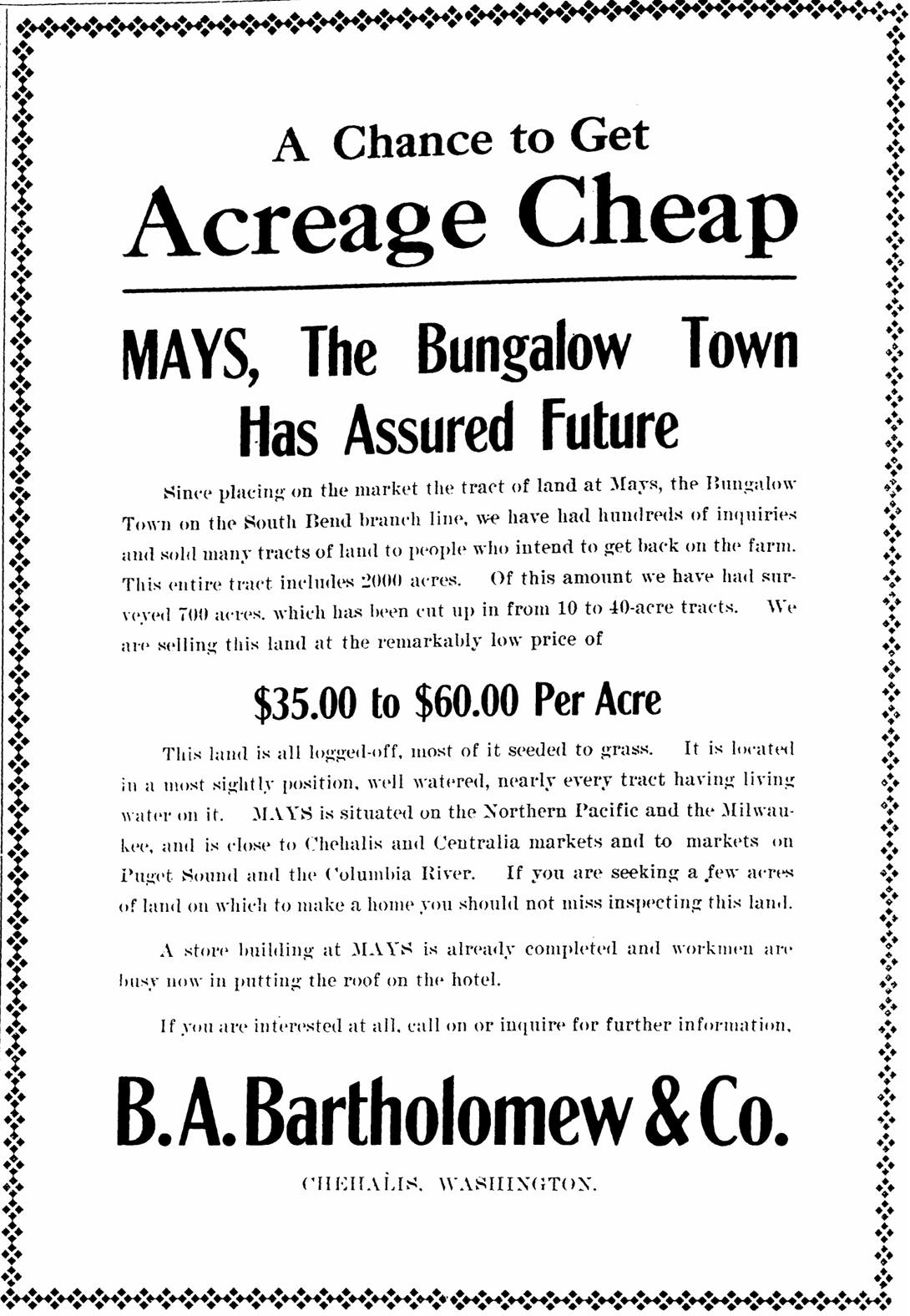
- Planned community advertisement, Chehalis Bee-Nugget, 1914

- Location within Washington (state) Location within the United States
- Coordinates: 46°38′9.37″N 123°10′36.5″W
- Country: United States
- State: Washington
- County: Lewis
- Established: March 1914
- Elevation: 243 ft (74 m)
- Time zone: UTC-8 (Pacific (PST))
  - Summer (DST): UTC-7 (PDT)
- Area code(s): 360, 564
- GNIS feature ID: 1514889

Mays is a former planned community in Lewis County, in the U.S. state of Washington. Considered a populated place, the town was located near the Chehalis River and off Washington State Route 6 (SR 6), east of Dryad and immediately west of Meskill.

Mays was formed in 1914 by the Baker-May Lumber Company; the company oversaw timber operations in the nearby area since the early 1900s and operated a sawmill in the community. Along with a real estate company, the community was planned to be a "people's town" and not a standard company town. A townsite was rapidly constructed during its opening year, including the build of a 35-room hotel, a theater, and a town hall. Plots of cleared land over 5 acres (2.0 ha) were available for sale to prospective buyers.

In 1915, the Baker-May Lumber Company was declared bankrupt and the sawmill was closed. No known depot or post office had been established, and mail delivery to the community ceased approximately in 1916.

== Etymology ==
The community was named after the owner of the Baker-May Lumber Company. (Note: Sources do not give a first name for the namesake of the community; the owner is only referred to as "Mr. May". See sources throughout the article.)

== History ==
The Baker-May Lumber Company opened a sawmill at what later became the community of Mays "shortly after 1900". Mays became a railroad stop on the South Bend branch of Northern Pacific Railroad by 1913, and the company planned opening a station in the town that was also to include a ticket office. A brothel was in existence that same year (Note: Residents of Mays planned to tar and feather the female owner of the "house of ill repute" and have her ridden out of town by rail. During the threats, the woman married a Meskill man, referred to in news reports as "a Greek", and ultimately, the county sheriff's department could not procure enough evidence against her.) and a grade school had already been established near the townsite.

The beginning of Mays as a planned community was officially announced in March 1914 and was a cooperative effort between Baker-May Lumber Company and real estate firm, B.A. Bartholomew & Company. The location, off what was then called the National Park Highway, was noted to be "very advantageously situated" due to the intersecting or parallel rail lines of the Milwaukee Road, Northern Pacific, and the incorporated Meskill and Columbia River Railroad. Already cleared land around the townsite was platted for sale, with plots no smaller than 5 acres (2.0 ha). The new community was to be known as "the bungalow town" as two-five room bungalows, and a store matching the same architectural style, were planned to be built. Seven lots had been sold by mid-April. (Note: Reports on the numbers of lots and acreage sold varies per the source. By early May 1914, a news listing in the San Juan Islander reported six parcels sold. See other sources from 1914 in the article.)

The town underwent rapid expansion into July 1914, with the construction of a 35-room hotel, (Note: The hotel was listed to have had an L-shaped footprint, the main section being 32 ft × 90 ft (9.8 m × 27.4 m) and the dimensions of the extension were 32 ft × 50 ft (9.8 m × 15.2 m).) general store, a "moving picture house", pool room, and a town hall. Offices for the Baker-May sawmill were also completed. The hotel was known as the Hotel Mays. Additional planned buildings included a drug store and a meat market, and land for the planned depot was to be donated by the developers. The townsite was to be lighted electrically, the power generated by Baker-May's operations.

The planned community was to be a "people's town" and not a standard company town. The only oversight of the community by Baker-May was the electrical current provided to the townsite.

Baker-May Lumber Company was declared bankrupt in May 1915. By April 1916, the mill was noted to be closed.

=== Post office ===
The post office in nearby Meskill had been without a postmaster by late 1913 and a new office was planned to be established in Mays. Within three days of the initial news, a letter from Congressman Albert Johnson announced that a new postmaster was to be appointed at Meskill and the Mays office "will not go through". Mail delivery was discontinued approximately around 1916. (Note: A few sources written later in the 20th century mention a post office in Mays, but no definitive evidence of an established office has been found to support the statements. See sources throughout the article.)

== Geography ==
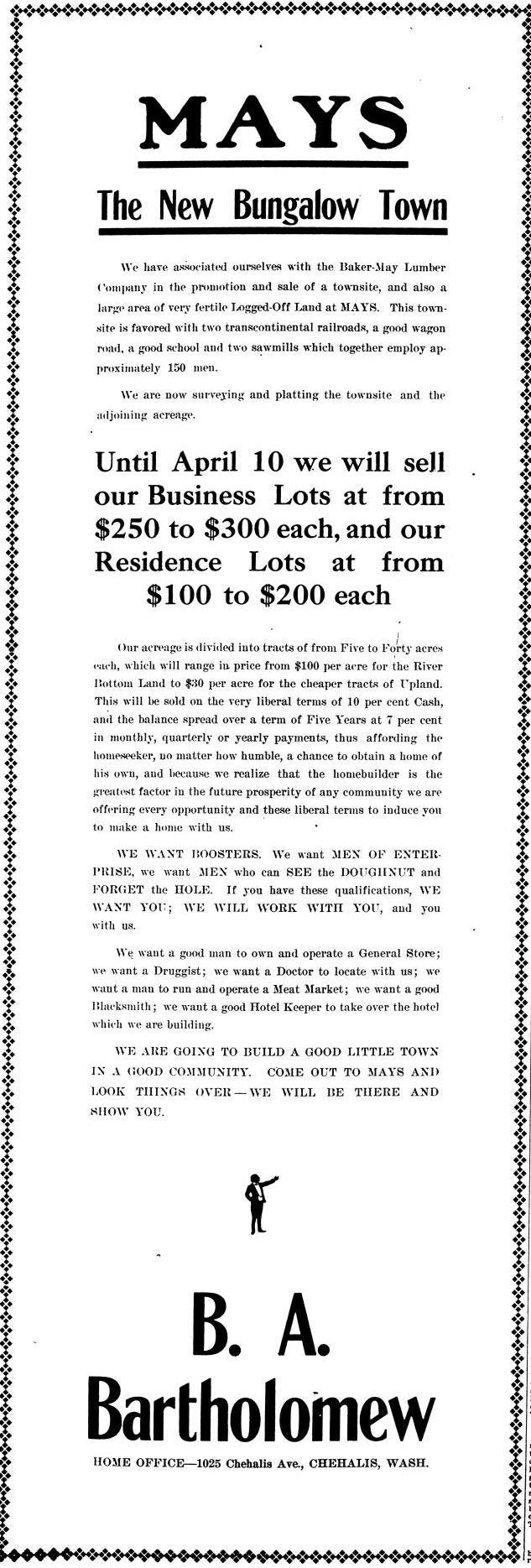
Additional advertisement, The Chehalis Bee-Nugget, 1914

Mays is considered a populated place, and potentially an unincorporated place, by the Geographic Names Information System. The town was located roughly 12 miles (19 km) west of Chehalis, near the Chehalis River and off Washington State Route 6 (SR 6), east of Dryad and approximately 1-mile (1.6 km) west of Meskill.

== Parks and recreation ==
The Willapa Hills Trail passes near Mays. Rainbow Falls State Park is west of the former community.

== Economy ==
Mays grew out of an established sawmill company town. The Baker-May Lumber Company constructed a "big sawmill" and shingle mill in the town by 1914. The shingle factory was owned by brothers, C.A. and J.C. Butler.

== Education ==
A schoolhouse was located between Mays and Meskill and was part of Lewis County School District No. 118.

== Infrastructure ==
A bridge was relocated from Adna, Washington to Mays in 1921 and was expected to "last for many years there". Shortened to fit the crossing over the Chehalis River, the move was made possible due to the construction of a new span at Adna that was "heavier". The 130 foot (40 m) steel bridge was rebuilt at a cost of over $11,000 (equivalent to $198,554 in 2025). Within a week after the contract had been awarded, foundation piers were being constructed. The first Mays Bridge was completed and "accepted" by the Lewis County commissioner board in January 1922.

The second Mays Bridge was constructed by the Chicago, Milwaukee, and St. Paul Railroad in 1924. The span was one of three railroad bridges built over the Chehalis River by the company around the time, which included bridges connecting to the rail station at Ruth and the city of Chehalis. The overpass was a wood Howe truss that spanned 156 feet (48 m) and contained approximately 110,000 board feet of timber.

The current Mays Bridge, and the third iteration, was completed in 2016. The 200 foot (61 m) crossing was an upgraded replacement for the nearby Leudinghaus Bridge after severe floods during the Great Coastal Gale of 2007 destroyed the trestle. The Chandler Road Bridge, also in proximity, was likewise demolished during the same flood; the span was replaced in 2010.
