= SS George W. Elder =

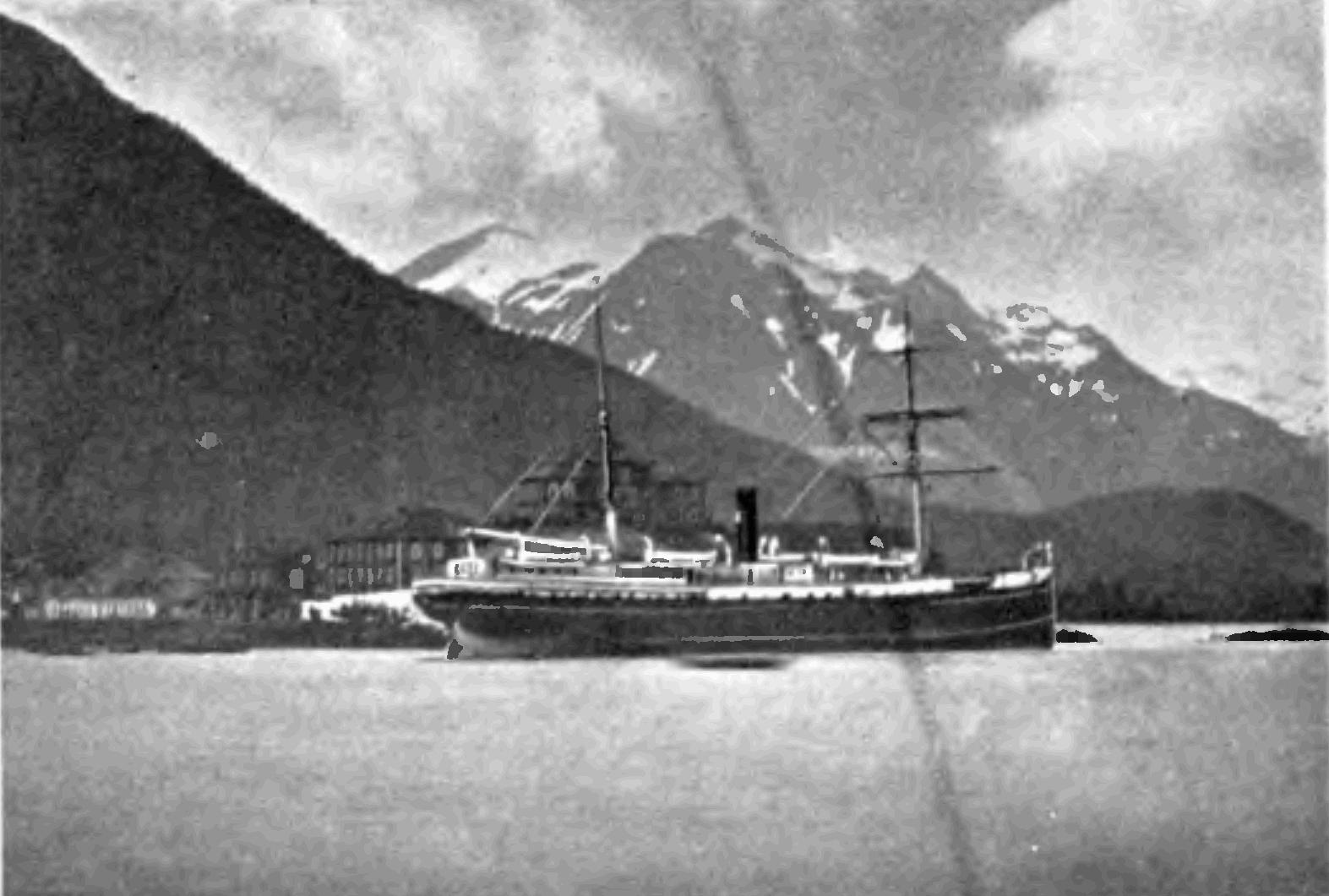
- The George W. Elder off Sitka, Alaska.

History

United States
- Name: George W. Elder
- Owner: Old Dominion Steamship Company; 1874–1876; Oregon Steamship Company; 1876–?; Oregon Railroad and Navigation Company; ?–1904; San Francisco and Portland Steamship Company; 1904–1905; North Pacific Steamship Company; 1905–1918
- Operator: Old Dominion Steamship Company; 1874–1876; Oregon Steamship Company; 1876–1879; Oregon Railroad and Navigation Company; 1879–1899; United States Army; 1899; Oregon Railroad and Navigation Company; 1899–1904; San Francisco and Portland Steamship Company; 1904–1905; North Pacific Steamship Company; 1905–1918
- Route: Chesapeake Bay to New York City; 1874–1876; San Francisco, California to Portland, Oregon; 1876–?
- Builder: Delaware River Iron Shipbuilding and Engine Works (Chester, PA)
- Launched: 1874
- In service: 1874–1918
- Out of service: 1918
- Fate: Sold in 1918
- Notes: Renamed America

Chile
- Name: America
- Owner: Artigas Riolrio Compania; 1918–1935
- Operator: Artigas Riolrio Compania; 1918–1935
- Route: Chilean coastal service
- Out of service: 1935
- Fate: Scrapped in 1935

General characteristics
- Type: Coastal passenger/cargo liner
- Length: 250 ft (76 m)
- Beam: 38 ft (12 m)
- Draft: 16 ft (5 m)
- Installed power: Single Triple expansion engine
- Propulsion: Single screw

SS George W. Elder (1874–1935) was a passenger/cargo ship. Originally a U.S. east coast steamer, she was built by John Roach & Sons in Chester, Pennsylvania. The George W. Elder became a west coast steamer in 1876 and served with the Oregon Steamship Company, Oregon Railroad and Navigation Company, San Francisco and Portland Steamship Company and the North Pacific Steamship Company. In 1907, the George W. Elder helped to rescue the survivors of her former running mate Columbia. The last owners of the George W. Elder were a Chilean firm which operated her under the name America. Chilean Coast was finally scrapped.

== History ==
The George W. Elder was launched in 1874 at the Delaware River Iron Ship Building and Engine Works of John Roach & Sons in Chester, Pennsylvania and first served as a nightboat for the Old Dominion Steamship Company on the New York City to Chesapeake Bay route. She was equipped with brigantine-rig sail configuration and a triple-expansion steam engine rated between 900 hp (671 kW) and 1,000 hp (746 kW). The George W. Elder drew 16 ft (5 m) of water, was 250 ft (76 m) long, had a beam of 38 ft (12 m) and measured 1,709 gross tons. Due to her design, the George W. Elder was able to visit several different ports.

In 1876, the George W. Elder was sold to the Oregon Steamship Company, which brought the ship around Cape Horn and placed her on the San Francisco, California to Portland, Oregon route. The George W. Elder became part of the Oregon Railroad and Navigation Company fleet after O.R. & N purchased the Oregon Steamship Company. In O.R. & N service, the George W. Elder served alongside the innovative Columbia, which was the first structure to use the incandescent light bulb outside Thomas Edison's laboratory in Menlo Park, New Jersey. O.R. & N was bought out by the Union Pacific Railroad in 1898.

During her O.R. & N years, the George W. Elder was frequently skippered by Captain Charles Henry Lewis. In April of 1892, he was washed overboard and nearly drowned, while tending deck gear in choppy waters. Captain Lewis was highly experienced but also controversial. While his career went back to the Japan voyages of Commodore Matthew Perry, he had also smuggled guns for the Confederacy and was a bigamist with East and West Coast wives and children. In 1898, captaining the S.S Clara Nevada (ex-Hassler) during the Yukon Gold Rush, Lewis would quietly reappear in Seattle after her sinking, widely reported to have been with all hands lost. In July 1891, Lewis took the George W. Elder on a voyage to Callao, Peru, carrying a cargo of wheat to relieve food supplies during a civil war. On this trip, his West Coast wife Isabel (nee Laura Isabel Mann) rode along; the trip served as a prelude to her January 1892 solo return to Callao carrying a smuggled consignment of opium--solicited by a contact she had flirted with during the George W. Elder visit. She died in Callao from cyanide poisoning; Peruvian investigation and prosecution was inconclusive. Captain Lewis remarried in San Francisco 8 days after receiving the news.

On May 31, 1899, the George W. Elder set out from Seattle, Washington on a voyage of scientific exploration to Russia, via British Columbia and Alaska. Although her stopovers were brief, the actions and nature of research done on the George W. Elder followed tradition. The voyage, called the Harriman Expedition, was over 9,000 mi (14,484,096 m) long. The George W. Elder was captained by Peter A. Doran during this expedition.

After the Harriman Expedition, the United States Army drafted the George W. Elder in November 1899 for use as a troopship in the Philippines during the Spanish–American War. Strangely, during this time the owners of the George W. Elder were listed as Goodall, Perkins & Company, the agents of the Pacific Coast Steamship Company who were the owners of the ill-fated Pacific back in 1875. In December of the same year, she was returned to O.R. & N.

In 1904, the George W. Elder was transferred to the newly formed San Francisco and Portland Steamship Company along with the Columbia. During this time, the George W. Elder continued to build on its reputation for being a safe vessel. In 1905 however, this reputation vanished, when the George W. Elder, now 31 years old, struck a rock along the Columbia River and sank under 16 ft (5 m) of water. She was raised in May, 1906. After being salvaged, the San Francisco and Portland Steamship Company abandoned her and she was sold in Auction to Captain J.H. Peterson. In 1906, the George W. Elder was sold to the North Pacific Steamship Company, who would be her last American owners. In a chance of coincidence, the George W. Elder was paired the SS Roanoke, which had also been built as a nightboat for the Old Dominion Steamship Company.

On July 21, 1907, the former running mate to the George W. Elder, the Columbia collided with the lumber schooner San Pedro off Shelter Cove, California, causing the Columbia to sink, killing 88 people. Among the dead was Captain Peter A. Doran, who had commanded the George W. Elder on her 1899 Harriman Expedition. Both the George W. Elder and Roanoke arrived at the site of the disaster and picked up Columbia's survivors from the badly damaged San Pedro. The George W. Elder returned some of the survivors to Astoria, Oregon. The George W. Elder also towed the San Pedro to shore, following the disaster.

By 1915, the North Pacific Steamship Company was struggling, due to the loss of their steamer Santa Clara on the bar of Coos Bay, Oregon, in 1914. The management considered closing the company's doors. Thankfully, relief came when the California South Seas Navigation Company chartered both Roanoke and George W. Elder. Neither were used for passenger service under this charter. Unfortunately, the Roanoke capsized and sank off the California coastline, on her second voyage under the charter. Only three people survived. During World War I, the George W. Elder was leased by the Pacific Mail Steamship Company, which was at the time owned by the Grace Line. The George W. Elder was used during this time as part of a four ship feeder service for Central American and Mexican ports.

At war's end, now 44 years old, the George W. Elder was sold to Artigas Riolrio Compania, based in Valparaiso, Chile; they were to be her last operators. The George W. Elder was renamed America and served the Chilean coastline until 1935. On 7 December 1928, the Chilean cargo ship SS Quintero collided with America and sank.

America survived the collision and was reported scrapped in 1935, but it remains uncertain whether the job was done in Japan or Valparaiso. Either way, America had reached an outstanding age of 61 years.

== See also ==
- SS Parthia (1870)
- SS Columbia (1880)
