= SS Columbia (1880) =

American cargo and passenger steamship (1880–1907)

Coordinates: 39°57′29.43″N 124°11′2.26″W

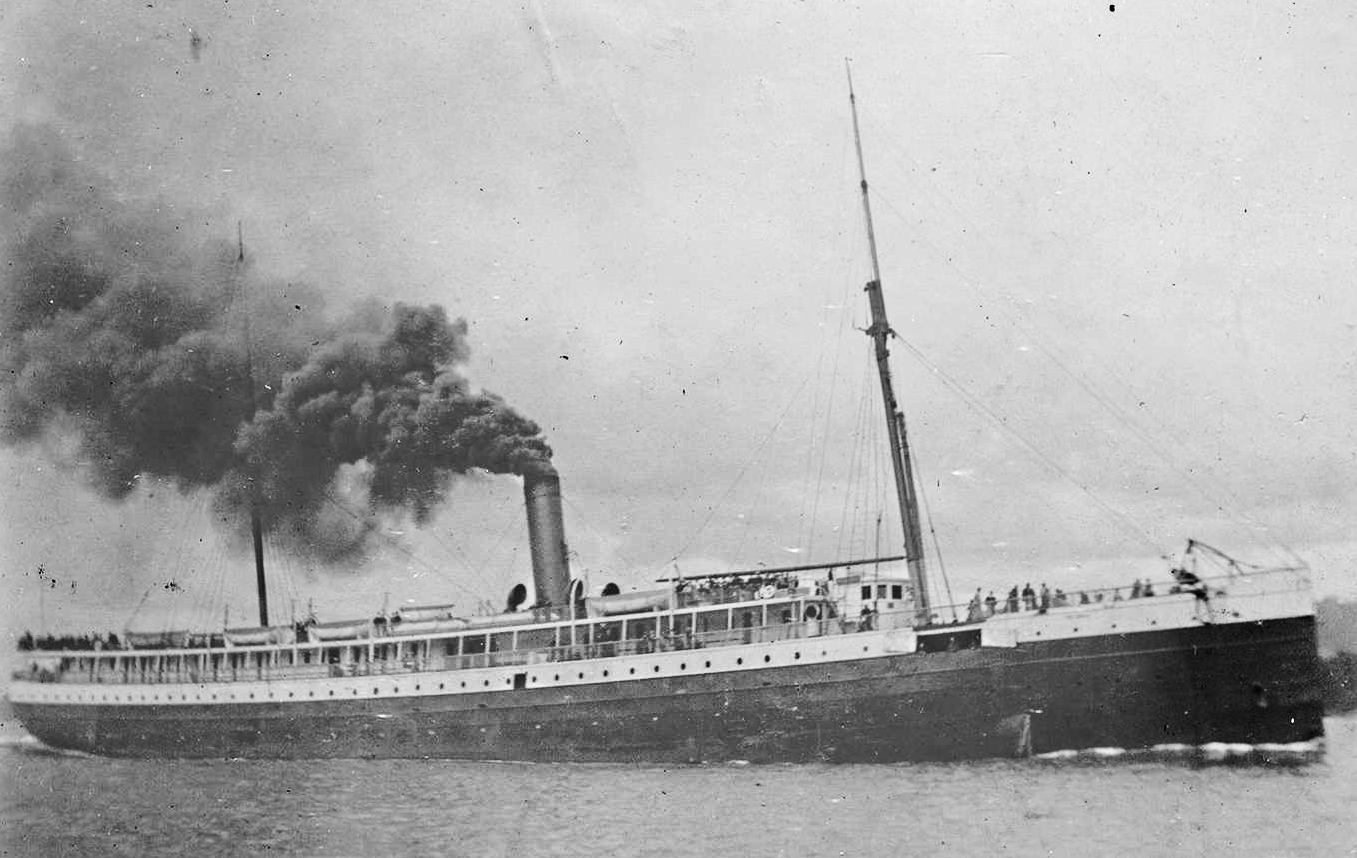
- Photograph of SS Columbia under way

History

United States
- Name: Columbia
- Owner: Oregon Railway and Navigation Company; 1880–1898; Union Pacific Railroad; 1898–1907
- Operator: Oregon Railway Navigation Company; 1880–1904; San Francisco and Portland Steamship Company; 1904–1907
- Port of registry: Portland, Oregon, United States
- Route: San Francisco, California to Portland, Oregon via Astoria, Oregon
- Ordered: July 1879
- Builder: Delaware River Iron Ship Building and Engine Works (Chester, PA)
- Cost: US $450,000 in 1880
- Yard number: 193
- Laid down: September 1879
- Launched: 24 February 1880
- Completed: May 1880
- Maiden voyage: June 1880
- In service: 1880–1907
- Out of service: 21 July 1907
- Fate: Sunk, 21 July 1907, Shelter Cove, California
- Notes: Collided with the lumber schooner San Pedro

General characteristics
- Tonnage: 2,721 tons
- Length: 332 ft (101 m) (309 ft (94 m) below the waterline)
- Beam: 38.5 ft (12 m)
- Draft: 18 ft (5.5 m)
- Depth: 23 ft (7.0 m)
- Decks: 4
- Installed power: Six cylindrical 12 ft (3.7 m) diameter 12.5 ft (3.8 m) long boilers, powering two 42.5 in (1,080 mm) and 82 in (2,100 mm) by 54 in (1,400 mm) stroke compound condensing engines
- Propulsion: Single four bladed 16 ft (4.9 m) diameter Hirsch propeller
- Sail plan: Brigantine
- Speed: 16 kn (18 mph; 30 km/h)
- Capacity: 382 to 850 first class and steerage passengers
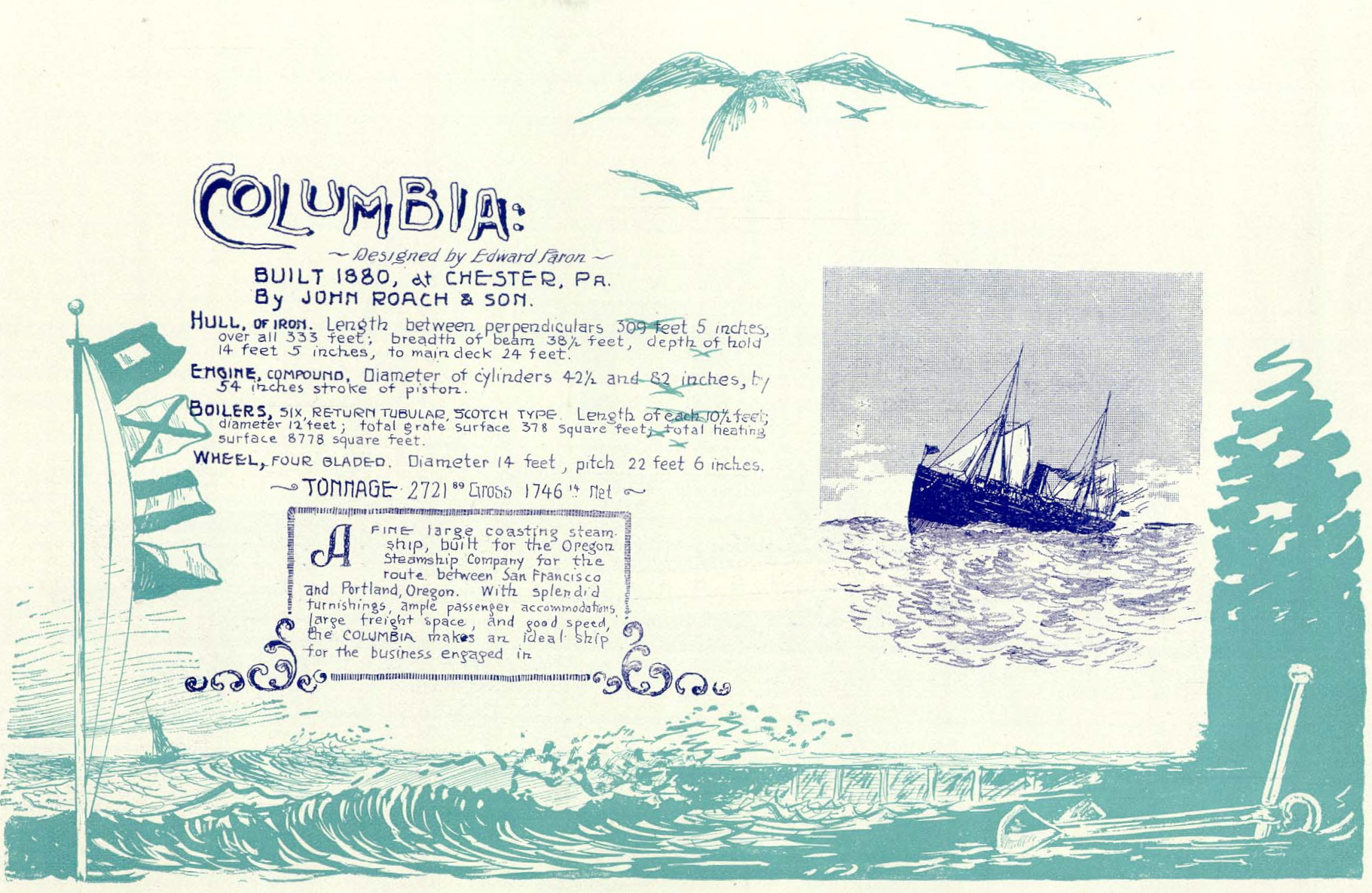
- Notes: The first ship to use electric light bulbs, and the first use besides Edison's lab of electric light. Columbia was equipped with four watertight bulkheads. It also featured eight metal lifeboats, one wooden lifeboat, one wooden workboat, five life rafts and 537 life preservers.

SS Columbia (1880–1907) was a cargo and passenger steamship that was owned by the Oregon Railway and Navigation Company and later the San Francisco and Portland Steamship Company. Columbia was constructed in 1880 by the John Roach & Sons shipyard in Chester, Pennsylvania for the Oregon Railway and Navigation Company.

Columbia was the first ship to carry a dynamo powering electric lights instead of oil lamps and the first commercial use of electric light bulbs outside of Thomas Edison's Menlo Park, New Jersey laboratory. Due to this, a detailed article and composite illustration of Columbia was featured in the May 1880 issue of Scientific American magazine.

Columbia was lost on 21 July 1907 after a collision with the lumber schooner San Pedro off Shelter Cove, California, with the loss of 88 lives.

== History ==
=== Construction and outfitting ===
After attending Thomas Edison's New Year's Eve lighting demonstration in Menlo Park, New Jersey, Henry Villard, president of the Oregon Railway and Navigation Company became enthusiastic of Edison's work. Villard subsequently ordered an Edison Lighting System to be installed on his company's new passenger steamer, Columbia. Although met with hesitation by Edison himself, the project moved forward, making the installation onboard Columbia Edison's first commercial order for the light bulb. Columbia would also be the first ship to utilize a dynamo. The success of Columbia's experimental dynamo system led to the system being retrofitted on to other vessels.

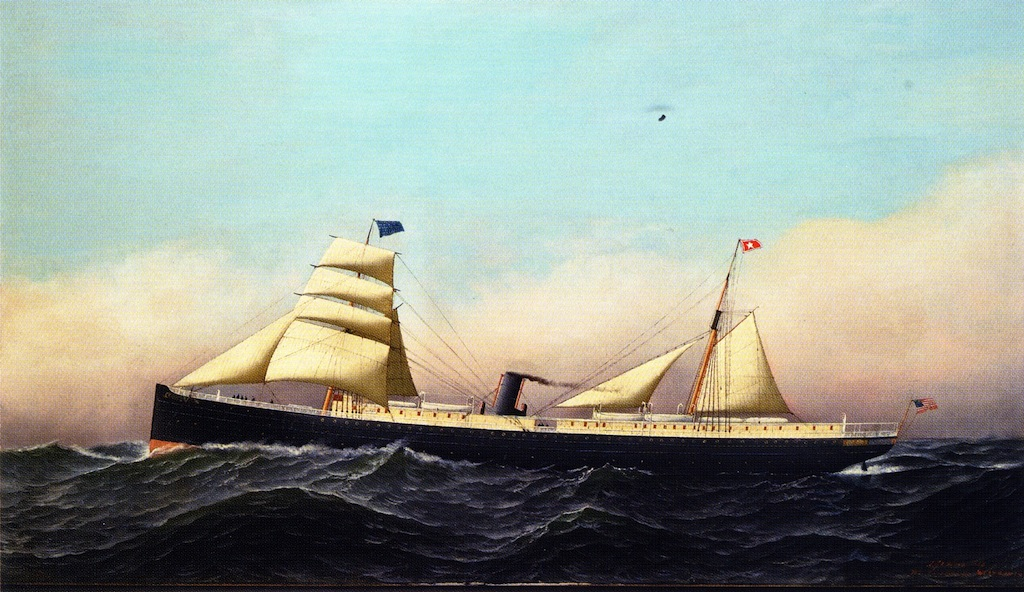
The SS Columbia around 1880, under full sail in rough seas displaying all of her colors

Columbia herself was ordered in July 1879 as Hull No. 193 at the John Roach & Sons Delaware River Iron Ship Building and Engine Works in Chester, Pennsylvania originally by the Oregon Steamship Company. That same year, the Oregon Railway and Navigation Company had bought and merged the Oregon Steamship Company into its own operations. Construction of Columbia began in September 1879. Columbia was launched at 11:40 am on February 24, 1880. Both the Bureau Veritas and American Shipmasters' Association oversaw her construction. Roach himself refused to install the incandescent light bulbs on board Columbia in fear of a possible fire breaking out. In May 1880, Columbia sailed to New York City, where Edison's personnel installed the new lighting systems. The light bulbs were carried aboard in a shopping basket by Francis R. Upton, a chief assistant of Edison. The first lighting of the ship took place on May 2, 1880.

=== Maiden voyage ===
Columbia finished her sea trials and sailed around Cape Horn to San Francisco, California loaded with 13 locomotives, 200 railroad cars and other railroad supplies. Columbia made a stop in Rio de Janeiro to replenish her coal supply and was exhibited to Emperor Pedro II of Brazil, who had a fascination with electricity. While passing through the Straits of Magellan, the propeller shaft and rudder were checked using light bulbs attached to a tallow covered cable.

After arriving in San Francisco without incident, the original carbon paper filament bulbs were replaced by a shipment of newer bamboo filament bulbs, sent by Edison himself. The chief engineers of Columbia sent a letter of satisfaction to Edison complimenting the superior performance of the light system, stating that none of the lights gave out after 415 hours and 45 minutes of constant use. Columbia safely arrived in Portland on August 24, 1880. Despite this, insurance companies were reluctant at first to underwrite the brand new vessel.

=== Subsequent operations ===
Columbia ran a regular service between Portland and San Francisco. When the paddle steamer Alaskan was sunk by a storm in 1889, Columbia carried its captain and crew to Astoria.

The success of the Edison lighting systems onboard Columbia eventually convinced other shipping companies to install similar systems in their vessels, including the British Cunard Line. The next year, Cunard's SS Servia became the first major ocean liner to be lit up by the incandescent light bulb. In service, the Columbia was greatly appreciated for its reliability.

The Columbia's record on the Portland and San Francisco route is remarkable, as only once in fifteen years has she been longer than one night at sea on the down trip between two cities.
~E.W. Wright – Lewis and Dryden's Marine History of the Pacific Northwest – 1895

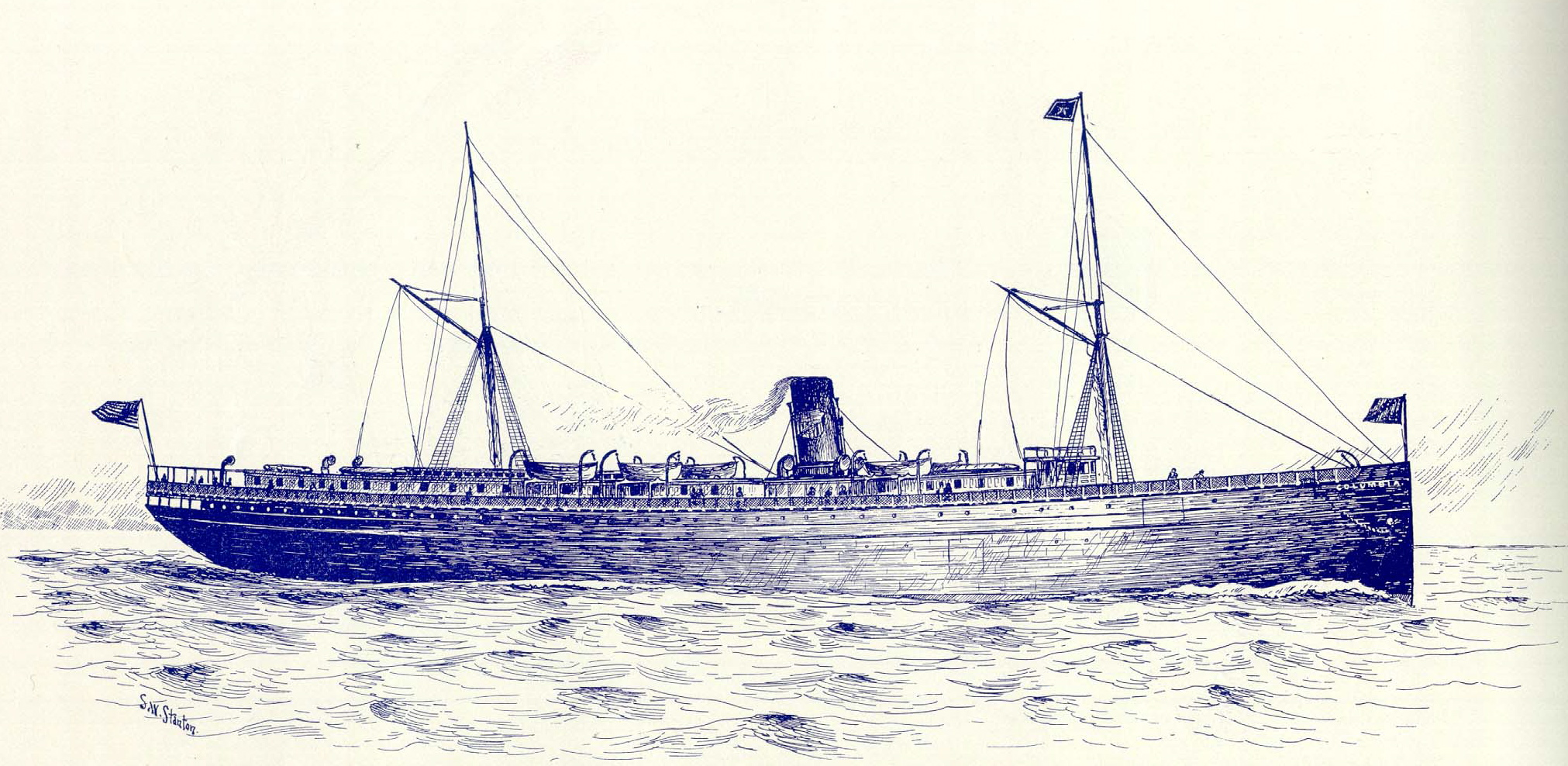
Artwork of the SS Columbia in the late 1890s. The Union Pacific Railroad logo is sported on the ship's funnel.

During a major overhaul in July 1895, the original Edison generators were removed in favor of modern counterparts. The dynamos were donated to the Smithsonian Institution and The Henry Ford in Dearborn, Michigan. Three years later, the Oregon Railway and Navigation Company was taken over by the Union Pacific Railroad.

On January 30, 1898, the Columbia broke the speed record between San Francisco and Portland. Under the leadership of Captain Conway, she left her San Francisco dock at 10:09 am on January 28 and began travelling on a relatively calm ocean at a fast pace. On January 30 at 1:25 am, the Columbia passed the Columbia River lightship, but was delayed for 12 minutes due to fog. After the fog lifted, the Columbia reached Astoria at 3:20 am and arrived in Portland at 10:27 am. It had taken barely two days for Columbia to travel between Portland and San Francisco. Although the Columbia was delayed by one hour due to stopping a few times, she was able to shave one hour off the previous speed record.

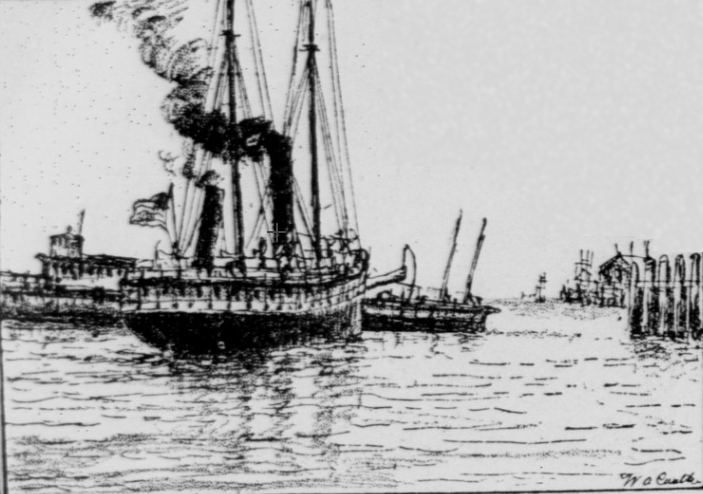
The Columbia colliding with the ferryboat Berkeley in San Francisco on October 3, 1900

Following the sale of its steamship, the Oregon in 1899, the Oregon Railroad and Navigation Company considered placing the Columbia and its fellow steamer, the State of California, into Alaskan service to Nome. On October 3, 1900, the Columbia was steaming slowly towards its dock in San Francisco, while the ferryboat Berkeley was preparing to leave her slip. Captain Peter A. Doran of the Columbia and Captain "Jim" Blaker of the Berkeley mis-interpreted each other's signals, which led to the Columbia colliding with the Berkeley, destroying one of the ferry's lifeboats and badly damaging the Columbia's bow. Both ships were taken out of service to be repaired following this incident. Another screw steamer owned by the Oregon Railroad and Navigation Company, the George W. Elder, temporarily took over the Columbia's route. On September 14, 1902, the Columbia ran aground near Astoria due to low tide. She was subsequently refloated at high tide and returned to Portland the following night. In 1904, the Columbia and the George W. Elder transferred to a new Union Pacific subsidiary called the San Francisco and Portland Steamship Company. By this time, the Columbia was considered to be an outdated vessel.

In 1905, the new company was plagued by two unfortunate events. The George W. Elder struck a rock in the Columbia River and sank. She was later refloated and purchased by the North Pacific Steamship Company after being abandoned by her owners. The same year, the Columbia collided with a wood barge in the Columbia River, resulting in the ship being badly damaged. Although spared from a similar fate to the George W. Elder, she needed to be repaired in San Francisco. On February 1, 1906, the Columbia collided with a log raft on the Columbia River in dense fog. Luckily, the Columbia was not damaged in the incident. The fog however worsened enough to cause Captain Peter A. Doran to anchor the ship until the fog lifted.

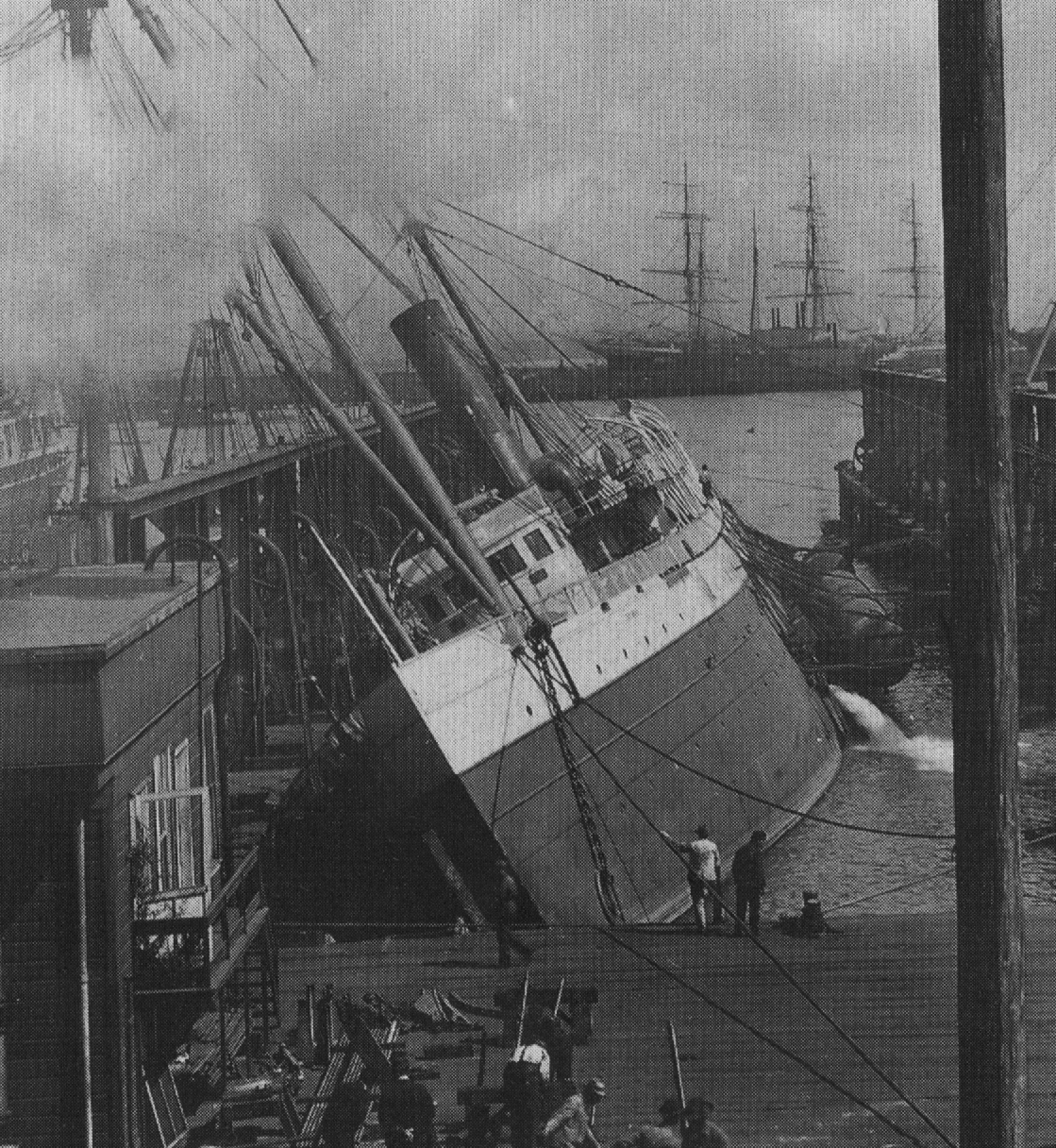
Columbia lying on her side at the Union Iron Works dock following the 1906 San Francisco earthquake

Columbia was undergoing a refit at the Union Iron Works dock, when the 1906 San Francisco earthquake occurred. The quake caused Columbia to knock off its supports, roll on her starboard side and hit the dock. The ship's large iron hull was damaged filling it partially full of water. It took two months to make the temporary repairs to the vessel. Unfortunately, the hydraulic drydock being used by the Columbia had taken irreparable damage from the liner's iron hull. The drydock had been of great use to the shipyard. Columbia was sent to Hunter's Point for permanent repairs. Along the way, the crew abandoned ship after a steam pipe exploded. Columbia eventually made it to dry dock and repairs were finally done. During her absence, the Columbia was temporarily replaced by the steamer Costa Rica (also owned by the San Francisco and Portland Navigation Company) and the steamer Barracouta, which was being leased from the Pacific Mail Steamship Company. Columbia was returned to service in January 1907. Soon after returning to service on January 17, 1907, the Columbia became trapped in an ice pack on the Columbia River for four days near St. Helens, Oregon. The steamship Aragonia attempted to break through the pack ice and free the Columbia on January 18. The efforts by the Aragonia were successful and allowed Columbia to steam free of the ice via the path Aragonia had cut for her. When Columbia returned to San Francisco, the ship appeared visibly unscathed.

== Design and accommodations ==
Columbia, designed by shipwright Edward Faron, was about 300 feet (91 m) long with about 310 feet (94 m) visible above the waterline. She had a beam of 38 feet 6 inches (11.73 m) and a depth of 23 feet (7.0 m). She had two compound condensing steam engines with a 42.5 in (1,080 mm) and 82 in (2,100 mm) by 54 in (1,400 mm) stroke driving a single Hirsch four-bladed propeller with a diameter of 16 feet (4.9 m). The propeller had a mean pitch of 27 feet (8.2 m) and could do 65 revolutions per minute. The blades of the propeller were able to be removed individually or all at once. Powering the engine were six boilers with a diameter of 12 feet (3.7 m) and a length of 12 feet 6 inches (3.81 m) each. Each boiler had a working pressure of 80 pounds per square inch (550 kPa). Columbia was a coal-powered steamship, able to carry a maximum of 300 tons of coal within her bunkers. She had an estimated top speed of 16 knots (30 km/h; 18 mph). She also carried a single donkey boiler and an auxiliary steam engine which powered the bilge and could supply water to the boilers should the fires break out of control. A second auxiliary steam engine powered the ship's electricity. Columbia had an auxiliary Brigantine rig sail plan with over 15,000 yards (14,000 m) of canvas. The sails would be rigged upon two iron masts.

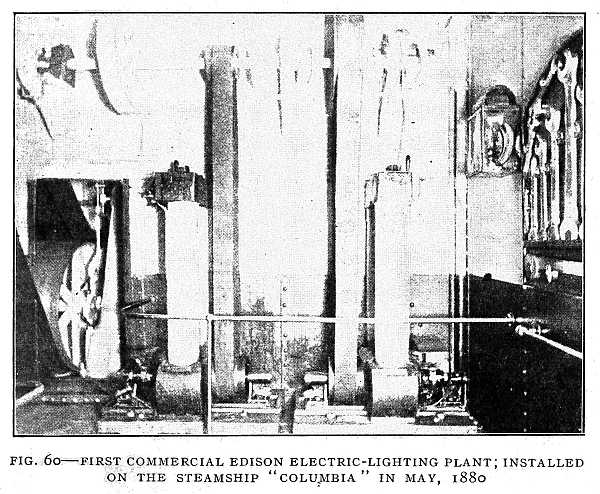
The Edison dynamos of the SS Columbia as seen in May 1880

Columbia had four decks, three of which were the Spar deck, Main deck and Hurricane deck. The Spar deck was completely of iron construction and the Main had a mix of wood and iron. All the decks had iron framing. Columbia had four watertight compartments. She also utilized electric fire alarms and annunciators with several hydrants in case of fire. Electric head and side lights were used for navigation. These navigational lights were powered by an auxiliary dynamo between decks. The navigational electric system was of Hiram Maxim's design, where the main electrical systems were Edison's. The bridge and engine room were able to communicate by telegraph. The cargo holds of Columbia were equipped with double steam-powered elevators.

The passenger comforts and amenities of Columbia were highly innovative and advertised as luxurious. She had a large refrigeration room in her stern for holding food items such as fresh meat. The large refrigerator was capable of keeping a constant cold temperature regardless of the outside temperature. Columbia also included ventilation and heating systems. The main saloon included a Bohemian glass shade illuminated by an electric light bulb. The remainder of the saloon's light bulbs were encased in frosted glass lamp fixtures. The main dining room boasted French walnut, Hungarian ash, mahogany and maple wooden paneling. Wooden furniture and carpeting further complimented the room's elegance. Telephones were provided in key rooms to allow easier communication between the ship's crew. The bridge was fitted with electrical indicators and monitoring equipment which would have alerted the captain the status of the engine as well as simplifying commands between the captain and engine room. Columbia had first-class staterooms for 250 individuals and could accommodate 600 steerage passengers. The first-class staterooms had paneling and furniture commonly seen on first-class Pullman rail cars on passenger trains, including folding berths in place of conventional beds. Columbia also boasted fresh-water plumbing still system.

By far the most innovative feature aboard the Columbia were her Edison incandescent light bulbs. If a passenger wanted his or her light turned off, a steward had to be summoned, who would unlock a rosewood box outside the cabin and turn the light off. All the lights were placed in the main salons and staterooms only. The passenger accommodations and luxuries aboard Columbia were designed to greatly surpass anything seen on previous liners along the Pacific coastline. Scientific American later published a large article describing the Edison lighting system aboard Columbia. All 120 light bulbs were connected via separate circuits to four 6-kilowatt Edison A Type "long legged Mary-Ann" dynamos, producing power via a belt drive connection to the main engines. The fourth dynamo was used to boost the magnetic fields of the other three and operated at a lower voltage. All four dynamos included two bipolar magnets along with lead wires that produced the multiple circuits. Each dynamo was capable of powering 60 light bulbs. Due to the lack of instrumentation, adjusting the voltage was judged by the brightness of light bulbs in the engine room. The wiring insulation was molten paraffin and cotton mix inside a rubber tube casing. The wires were also painted two separate colors to differentiate the negative and positive charges. Overall, the electrical systems aboard the Columbia held little difference from its Menlo Park counterparts. Oil lamps were readily available throughout the vessel in case of a power outage.

== Sinking ==
On 20 July 1907, Columbia departed San Francisco, California, with 251 passengers and crew for Portland, Oregon, under the leadership of Captain Peter Doran. When it became evening, Columbia became shrouded in fog about 12 miles (19 km) off Shelter Cove, but Captain Doran refused to slow the ship's speed. Even though the whistle of the steam schooner San Pedro could be heard nearby, neither Doran nor First Officer Hendricksen of San Pedro reduced the speed of either vessel. During this time, the rolling motion of the waves had caused many passengers to retire to their cabins due to seasickness. Fifteen minutes later, San Pedro was seen coming straight for Columbia. Doran finally ordered his ship to be put in full reverse, but it was too late. At 12:22 a.m. on 21 July 1907, San Pedro hit the starboard side of Columbia. Doran shouted at the other ship, "What are you doing man?" and continued his ordered reverse thrust, but the impact damaged the bow of the wooden-hulled San Pedro and holed Columbia, which started to list to starboard and sink by the bow. Passenger William L. Smith of Vancouver, Washington described the impact as being "soft", while music teacher Otilla Liedelt of San Francisco reported the impact as being severe.

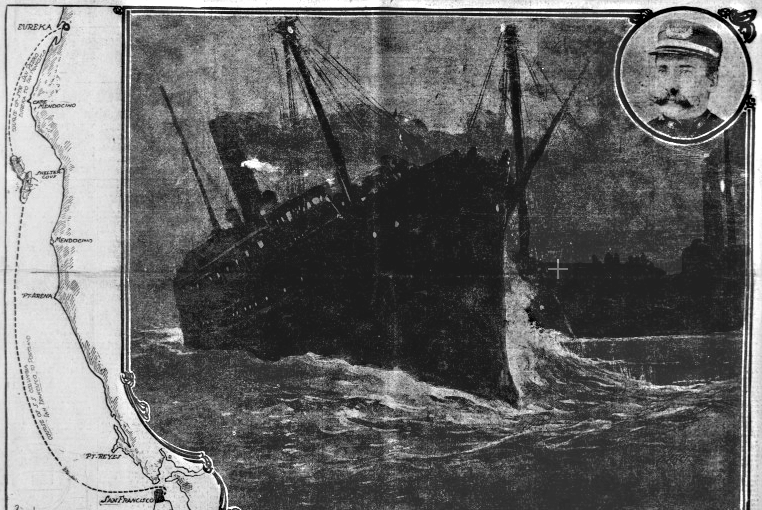
Columbia sinking, following the collision with the steam schooner San Pedro

Captain Doran ordered the passengers to go to the lifeboats and the lifeboats be lowered. Smith, concerned for the safety of his fellow passengers, began going from cabin to cabin and knocking on each door. Many passengers did not respond due to seasickness, while others hurriedly prepared themselves to abandon ship. Smith reported observing a small family holding hands in their cabin, rather than attempting to save themselves. As the ship was sinking, Liedelt noted that Captain Doran had tied the whistle cord down on the bridge and remained there as the ship sank, waving his hands in a final salute. After the bridge went underwater, the whistle died as well. Columbia at this point had developed a very noticeable list to starboard, allowing Lifeboat Number Four to be launched without being lowered. Eight and a half minutes after the collision, the Columbia began her final plunge. The stern of the ship rose out of the water and the ship slipped below the waves bow first in a matter of seconds. Once the ship was completely underwater, a large explosion occurred, sending many people dragged under by the Columbia back to the surface. While many survivors believed the explosion to have been caused by one of Columbia's boilers, Chief Engineer Jackson believed otherwise. He later stated, "I am quite positive that the boilers did not explode. I would have known if one did, as I stood directly above them when the ship pitched head foremost into the sea." Another theory is that a massive release of trapped air from the sinking Columbia caused the explosion. Among those now struggling in the water was 16-year-old Maybelle Watson, from Berkeley, California. Having been thrown from a lifeboat that capsized as it was lowered, the young girl found herself in the water with many others. Hearing another young woman crying for help nearby, Maybelle made her way over, finding a young schoolteacher flailing about, being repeatedly dunked forwards by her lifebelt. In the chaos, the woman had fastened it on backwards, and now this mistake threatened to drown her. Thinking quickly, Maybelle managed to force the woman upright again, continuing to hold her head above water until the lifeboat commanded by Officer Hawse pulled the two women on board.

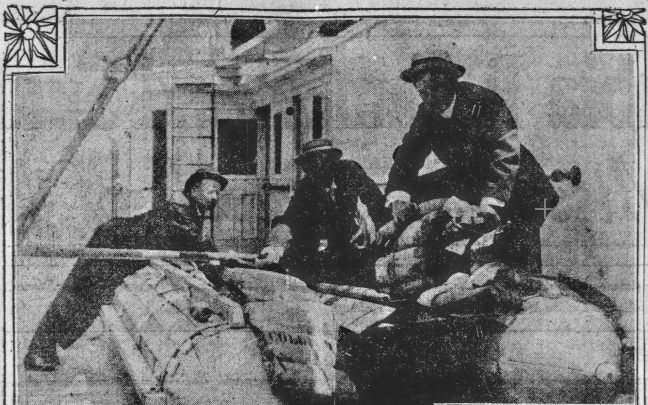
A recovered life raft and victim from the Columbia on board the steamer Roanoke

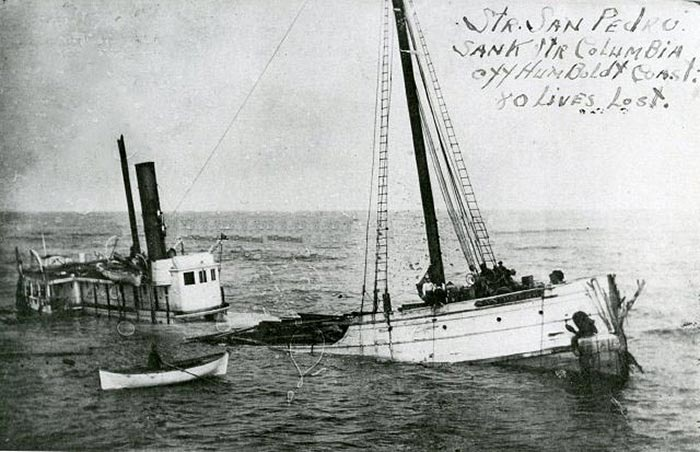
San Pedro half sunk and listing to starboard following the disaster

88 passengers and crew, including all the children on board, lost their lives during the sinking of Columbia. Due to the speed of the sinking, many lifeboats were unable to be launched. After the sinking, the lifeboats of Columbia and San Pedro launched a rescue effort assisted by the steamers Roanoke and George W. Elder, the latter one of Columbia's old running mates. Although badly damaged and partially sunk with a noticeable list, the 390,000 ft (118,872 m) of redwood being carried in the San Pedro's hull kept the steam schooner afloat. Close to 80 survivors were brought on board the San Pedro. Many were forced to hold on to one another so as not to be carried away by the lapping waves which lapped across the San Pedro's semi-submerged deck. Along with transporting the survivors of the Columbia, the George W. Elder also towed the damaged San Pedro to shore.

== Aftermath of the disaster ==
In the wake of the disaster, hull inspector John K. Bulger, who had inspected the hull of Columbia eight months earlier with hull inspector O.F. Bolles (coincidentally the first captain of the Columbia), testified that the ship was up to modern safety standards as Columbia carried four watertight bulkheads where law requires three watertight bulkheads in a ship of her size. Despite this, Bulger also testified should one of Columbia's compartments be punctured by a collision, the water would cascade over the ship's bulkheads, allowing the ship to sink. A similar flooding action would occur nearly five years later, during the sinking of the RMS Titanic in 1912. Bulger later re-testified, claiming two flooded compartments onboard Columbia would lead to disaster rather than one compartment being flooded. Despite Bulger's reports, it is likely the bulkheads installed aboard Columbia did little to delay the inrush of water. In addition, an issue of the San Francisco Examiner explained:

The Columbia, an iron hull vessel, bore the brunt of the impact, and her iron plates – brittle with age – cracked and the gash, seven feet across the forward hatch, allowed the water free ingress.

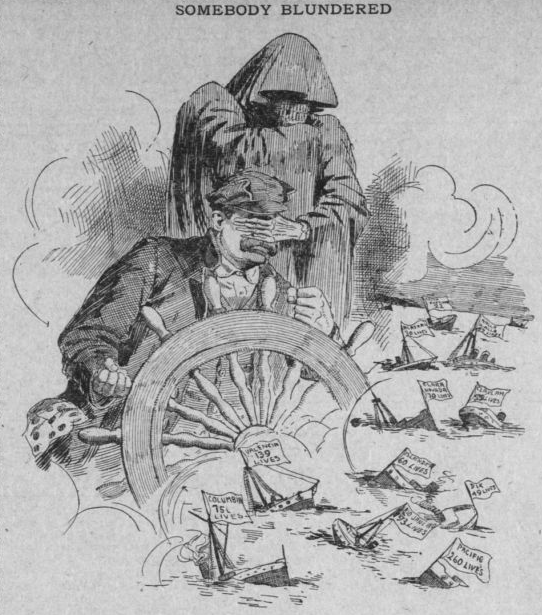
Political cartoon from the Morning Oregonian reflecting the public outrage towards alleged maritime safety violations. The general public believed this to have caused the sinking of Columbia.

Of the individuals involved in the Columbia sinking, Captain Doran of the Columbia and First Officer Hendrickson of the San Pedro were found to have the most responsibility for the collision. This led to Hendrickson's license being revoked for five years. In addition, Captain Magnus Hanson of the San Pedro was found to have given insufficient orders to his crew. He also did not come to the schooner's bridge when warned of the fog. Hanson's license was revoked for one year. Despite the errors made by both crews, the survivors and press gave praise to most of the crew members aboard Columbia and San Pedro for their courageous and lifesaving actions exhibited during the disaster.

One crew member who did not receive praise by most survivors was Third Officer Hawse of the Columbia. Hawse was reported to have shown aggressive and indifferent behavior towards injured survivors. He reportedly threatened to throw numerous survivors in his lifeboat overboard. Hawse later stated to the press, that he felt most of the men in the disaster refused to help many of the distressed women. He stated, "I would have shot them if I had a .45." Hawse even blamed Captain Hanson of the San Pedro for denying many survivors from boarding his vessel, which Hawse claimed led to the loss of many lives. Many survivors denied the truthfulness of Hawse's statement, regarding Hanson. Rumors began to spread about Hawse possibly having a morphine addiction. While at the U.S. Marine Hospital, Doctor S.B. Foster reported Hawse had requested the drug on three separate occasions. Hawse was arrested on July 29, 1907, while taking up residence in Second Officer Agerup's home in San Francisco. Hawse was reported to have shown signs of paranoia while being escorted to the Mission Street police station. He was subsequently admitted to the Central Emergency Hospital's detention ward.

After the sinking, the San Francisco and Portland Steamship Company leased the vessel City of Panama to fill the void left by Columbia. On August 8, 1907, the City of Panama was involved in a collision with the grounded steam schooner Alliance near the junction of the Willamette and Columbia Rivers. Due to the hull of Alliance being made of wood, the City of Panama received only minimal damage. The second officer of the City of Panama, Richard Agerup, had been on Columbia's bridge the night she sank. The sinking of Columbia, combined with the earlier losses of the Valencia, the Clallam and the City of Rio de Janeiro helped to extinguish public confidence in shipping lines and steamboat inspectors. Despite the severity of Columbia's sinking, some lessons were not learned from the tragedy. On August 29, 1929, over 22 years after the Columbia sank, the passenger steamer San Juan collided with the oil tanker S.C.T. Dodd in dense fog at night. San Juan sank in 3 minutes, killing 77 people. The sinking of the San Juan largely paralleled that of the Columbia. Furthermore, the Columbia and the San Juan were of a similar design, were built in the same shipyard, served similar routes, and were both outdated iron-hulled steamers. The San Pedro was repaired following the sinking and continued serving along the California coastline until being sold to foreign owners in 1920. She sank that same year. The Punta Gorda Light was established in response to the sinking. Rusting debris from Columbia including a boiler and bulkhead are still visible near the northern section of the Lost Coast Hiking Trail. Between 1899 and 1907, at least eight other ships had met their end in the area, including the St. Paul, whose rusted boilers can still be seen in the surf at Punta Gorda. https://www.lighthousefriends.com/light.asp?ID=63

Image Gallery

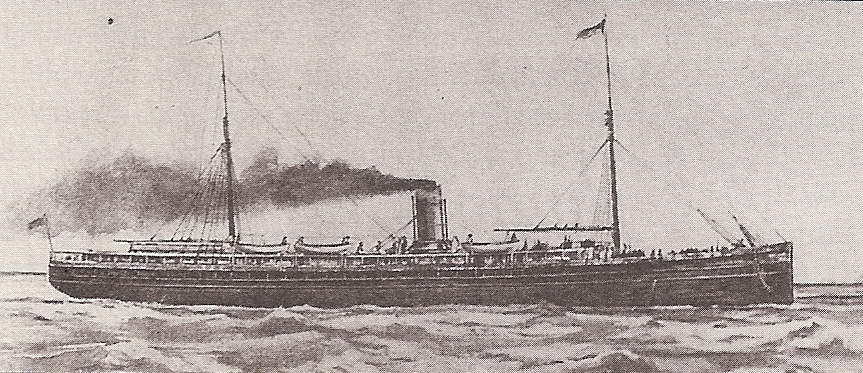
Early promotional artwork of the SS Columbia.

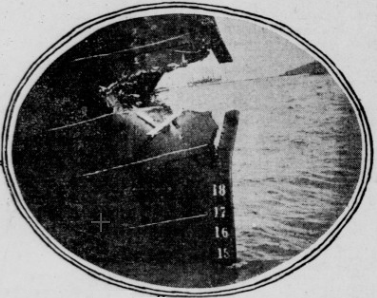
The damage sustained on Columbia's bow from the collision with the Berkeley.

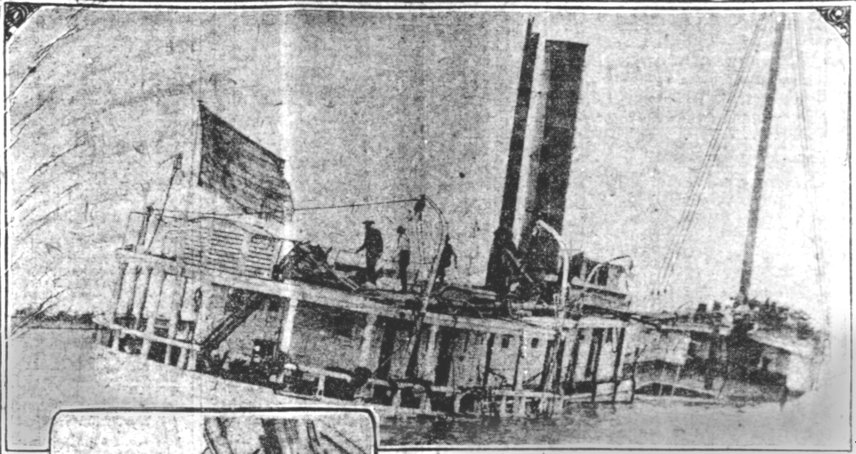
Stern view of San Pedro following the accident.
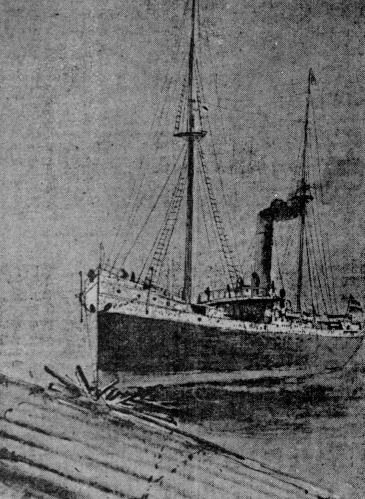
An illustration of the Columbia colliding with a log raft on the Columbia River on February 1, 1906.

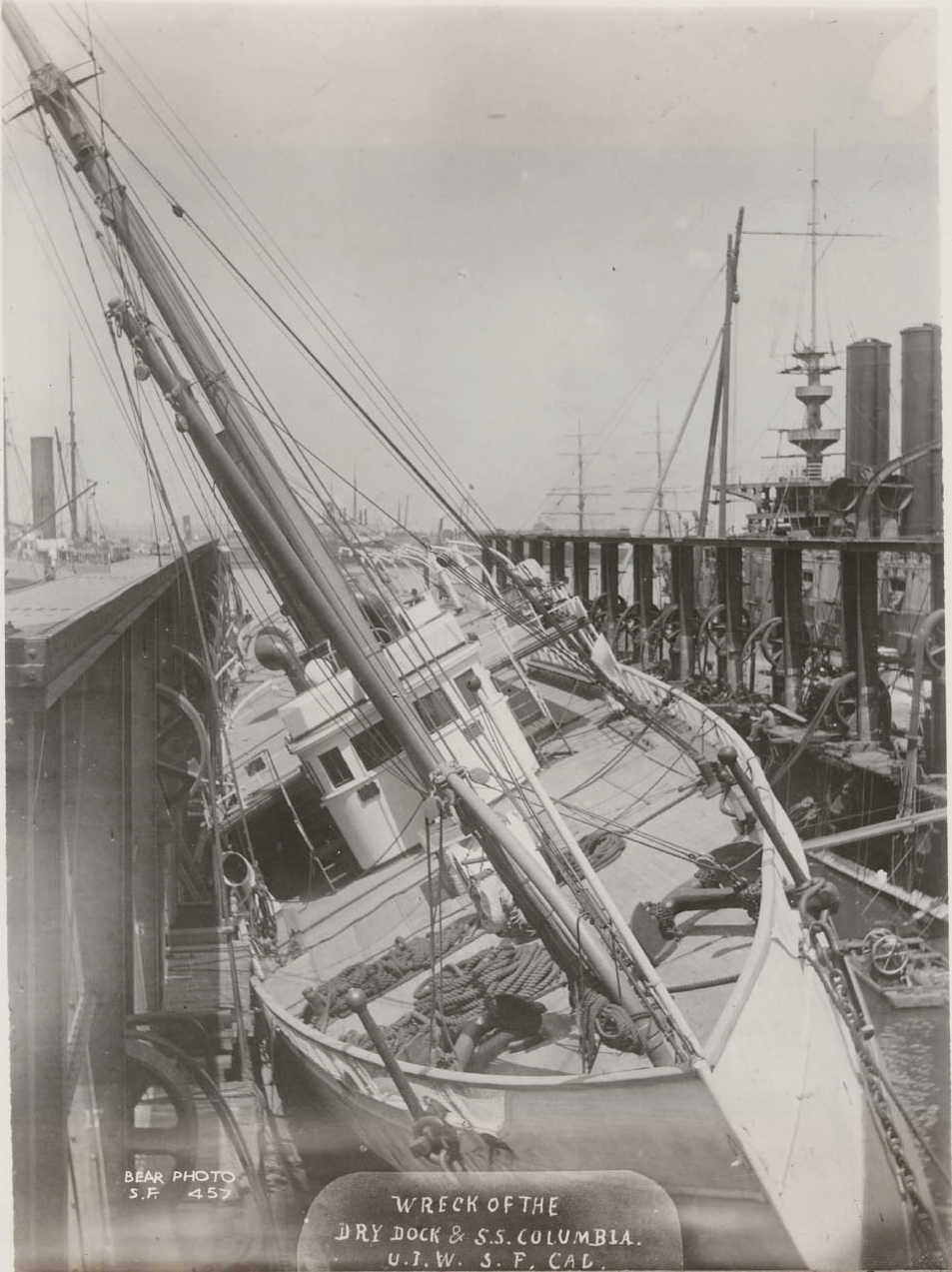
Close up of Columbia's bow following the 1906 earthquake.

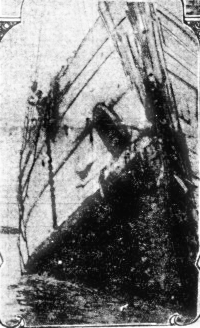
A close up of the San Pedro's bow, showing the damage sustained in the collision with the Columbia.

== See also ==
- Clallam (steamboat)
- Dix (steamboat)
- Empress of Ireland
- San Pedro (steam schooner)
- SS Andrea Doria
- SS City of Rio de Janeiro
- SS Pacific
- SS San Juan
- SS Valencia
