= Shelter Cove Airport =

Municipal airport in Shelter Cove, California, United States

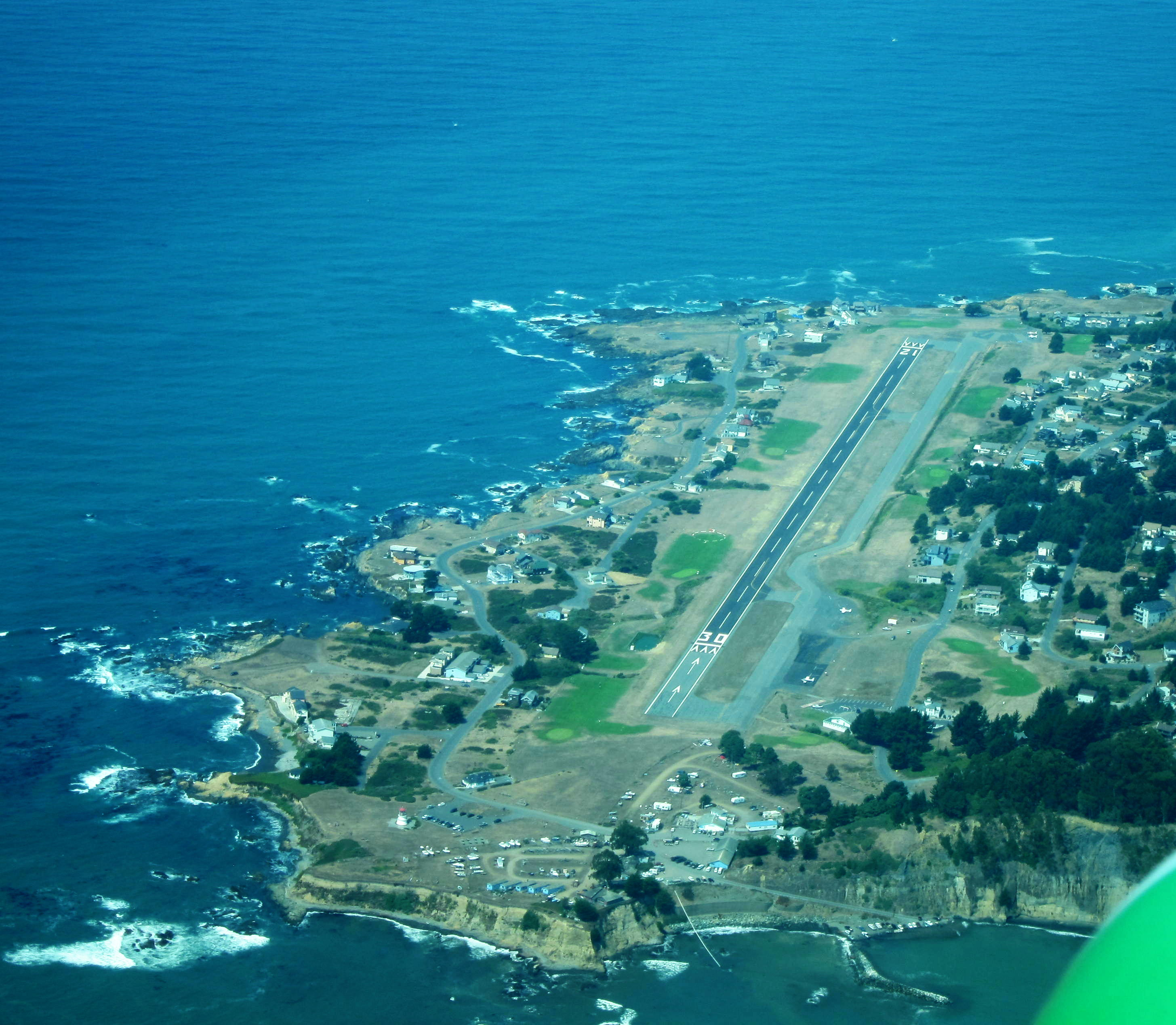
- 2012 photo
- IATA: none; ICAO: none; FAA LID: 0Q5

Summary
- Airport type: Public
- Operator: Shelter Cove Resort
- Location: Shelter Cove, California
- Elevation AMSL: 69 ft / 21 m
- Coordinates: 40°01′40″N 124°04′24″W
- Interactive map of Shelter Cove Airport

Runways
Direction	Length		Surface
Direction	ft	m	Surface
12/30	3,400	1,036	Asphalt

Shelter Cove Airport (FAA LID: 0Q5) is a public airport located in Shelter Cove, serving Humboldt County, California, USA. This general aviation airport covers 50 acres and has one runway.

The proximity to the ocean and on-field restaurant make the Shelter Cove Airport a popular fly-in destination when weather permits.

== Accidents and incidents ==
- On 28 June 1971, Douglas C-47 N90627 of Lake Riverside Estates crashed on take-off on a domestic non-scheduled passenger flight to San Jose International Airport. Seventeen of the 24 people on board were killed. The cause of the accident was that flight was attempted with the rudder and elevator gust locks in place. Inadequate pre-flight inspection was a contributory factor.
