= SS San Juan =

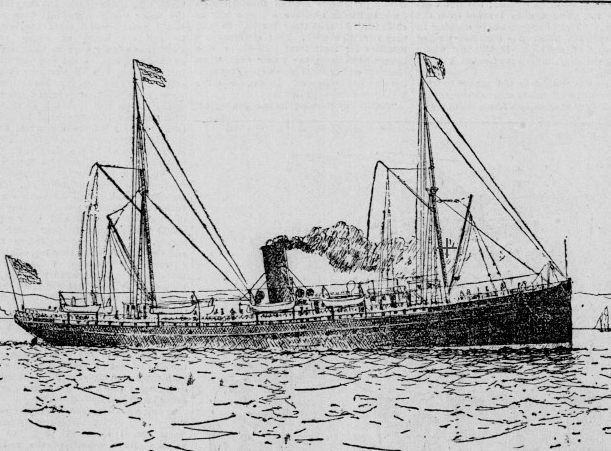
- An 1895 illustration of San Juan.

History

United States
- Name: San Juan
- Owner: Pacific Mail Steamship Company; 1882–1925; White Flyer Line; 1925–1927; Los Angeles and San Francisco Navigation Company; 1927–1929
- Route: Los Angeles, California to San Francisco, California
- Builder: Delaware River Iron Shipbuilding and Engine Works (Chester, PA)
- Launched: July 1882
- In service: 1882-1929
- Fate: Sunk in collision August 29, 1929
- Notes: Collided with oil tanker S.C.T. Dodd

General characteristics
- Type: Coastal passenger liner
- Installed power: A single two-cycle compound steam engine rated at 1,250 hp (932 kW)
- Propulsion: Propeller
- Capacity: 132 passengers
- Notes: Running mate to Humboldt. Carried six lifeboats, 110 adult lifejackets and 17 child lifejackets, two luminous buoys and a lyle gun.

SS San Juan was a passenger steamship owned by the Los Angeles and San Francisco Navigation Company. Previously, she was owned by the Pacific Mail Steamship Company and White Flyer Line. At the age of 47 years, San Juan was involved in a collision with the steel-hulled oil tanker S.C.T. Dodd. Because of her aged iron hull, San Juan was fatally damaged in the collision and sank three minutes later, killing 65 people. The loss of San Juan was strikingly similar to the loss of Columbia.

== History ==
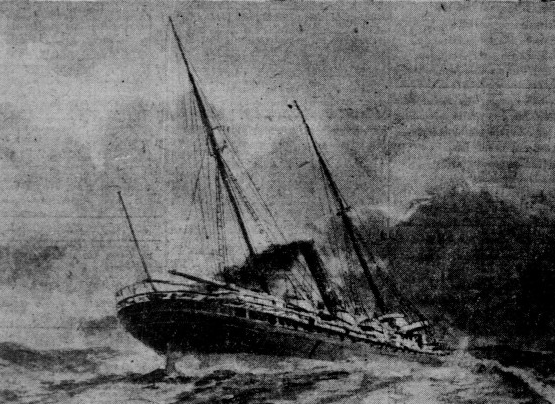
San Juan, caught in a bad storm in April 1905. The storm incapacitated San Juan's machinery, causing the vessel to arrive in San Francisco several days late.

San Juan was constructed at John Roach and Sons of Chester, Pennsylvania in 1882. Her eventual running mate was SS Humboldt.

In 1895, while San Juan was in service with the Pacific Mail Steamship Company, the passenger steamer Colima sank in a storm off Mazatlán, killing 100 people. San Juan arrived at the scene of the Colima's sinking and rescued her survivors. The crew of San Juan were later blamed by Colima's survivors for being negligent and leaving the scene of the disaster too soon.

In April 1905, San Juan was caught in a storm, which nearly capsized her. The storm damaged all her machinery, including her engine. Due to this, San Juan, now 24 years old, arrived late to San Francisco, California. At this point in her career, San Juan was known for being unreliably slow. In June 1905, San Juan carried 58 Russian immigrants from Panama to California, where they joined a Slavic community in Los Angeles, California. The immigrants came from Batum. One Russian girl on San Juan was supposedly suffering from trachoma, which threatened to have her deported when the steamer reached its American dock.

On August 29, 1907, John P. Poe Jr., a man known for being a successful football player, miner and dedicated soldier, travelled on board San Juan from Nicaragua to San Francisco. He had previously been arrested in Nicaragua when attempting to volunteer for an upcoming war. In November 1909, San Juan carried 1,673 tons of cargo and valuable treasure from the Charles Butters Mine in El Salvador. A fireman from the steamer Peru, Robert Latewitz, was also onboard San Juan, having been removed from his ship due to insanity. Latewitz was reported to have acted like a dog and walked on all fours across San Juan's deck.

In October, 1910, San Juan was involved in a collision with its fellow Pacific Mail Steamship Company steamer City of Sydney. The collision occurred while San Juan was docked at the Pacific Mail Steamship Company's pier in San Francisco. The incident was attributed to a misunderstanding of signals.

San Juan was owned by the Pacific Mail Steamship Company until it was acquired by W.R. Grace and Company in 1925. The newer and stronger vessels were kept by Grace, while the older vessels, including San Juan, were immediately offered for sale. San Juan and another aging steamer, Humboldt, were then purchased by the White Flyer Line and placed on the San Francisco to Los Angeles route. Both ships were operated on cut rate services.

In 1927, the White Flyer Line declared bankruptcy and San Juan along with Humboldt were sold to the Los Angeles and San Francisco Navigation Company. Despite the change in ownership, San Juan and Humboldt continued operating cut rate service along their usual route. The minimum cost of a ticket on board San Juan and Humboldt was $8.00. Despite their lack of luxury and old age, both San Juan and Humboldt appealed to many middle-class residents of Los Angeles and San Francisco traveling between the two cities for business purposes.

== Sinking ==
On August 29, 1929, San Juan departed San Francisco bound for Los Angeles two hours behind schedule with 119 passengers on board. Due to the late departure, the passengers began eating dinner while the ship was leaving port. That evening, a thick fog enveloped San Juan. During this voyage, she was mastered by Captain Adolf F. Asplund. He had commanded San Juan three times before.

Around 11:45 PM, the Design 1041 oil tanker S.C.T. Dodd of the Standard Oil Company of California began exchanging fog whistle blasts with San Juan. Not long afterwards, San Juan appeared in front of S.C.T. Dodd's bow. Both San Juan and S.C.T. Dodd were ordered to reverse thrust to prevent a collision. Despite all efforts, S.C.T. Dodd collided with San Juan's stern on her portside. Some survivors reported the collision was not greatly noticeable in feeling. On San Juan, steward William Gano's bunk was partially destroyed when S.C.T. Dodd's steel bow plowed straight through his room. Gano was able to escape by climbing up a rope leading to San Juan's main deck. The collision destroyed one of San Juan's lifeboats.

Some of the passengers on board San Juan were able to jump onto the deck of S.C.T. Dodd before the two ships drifted apart. Not long after the collision occurred, the lights went out on board San Juan. While heading up to San Juan's deck, passenger George Houghton, observed a group of distressed passengers by the main stairwell, shouting at each other and praying. Houghton compared the sight to Dante's Inferno. Shortly after the collision, San Juan began to capsize on its port side and start sinking stern first. Wireless operator Clifford Paulson hurriedly returned to his room and began sending out distress signals. Soon after a single ship had replied, water rushed in through Paulson's door and completely flooded his room. Paulson was able to escape.

Only three minutes after the collision, San Juan capsized completely onto her port side and sank by the stern. It was the fastest sinking of any ship on the West Coast of the United States. During this final plunge, San Juan's deck was torn apart. Survivors reported the final plunge took many by surprise, to the point where many were nearly dragged down with the sinking vessel. Many lifeboats were unable to be launched due to the speed of San Juan's foundering. S.C.T. Dodd and the freighter Munami immediately began pulling survivors from the water. After 8:00 A.M., no more survivors could be located. Munami subsequently transferred its injured survivors to the United States Coast Guard cutter Shawnee, where they would be transported to San Francisco. In total, the disaster claimed 77 people, leaving only 42 survivors.

== Aftermath ==
Public opinion in the United States heavily criticized the sinking of San Juan, as did many newspapers. On the other hand, maritime officials rebuked the negative statements sent forward by the media and general public. The argument carried forward by the general public stated San Juan, being 47 years old and poorly maintained by a cut rate carrier, should have not been allowed to continue sailing. The Steamboat Inspection Service, an entity of the Commerce Department which enforced American civil maritime regulations at the time of San Juan's sinking, was known for widespread corruption and being widely disorganized. A supervisor in steamship inspection, John K. Bulger (who coincidentally had been involved in the Columbia investigations) claimed that it did not matter what condition San Juan was in prior to the disaster, as the collision would have sunk the ship regardless. Despite Bulger's statement, the speed in which San Juan sank was more of a concern rather than whether the ship could survive the collision or not.

A similar disaster had previously occurred little over 22 years earlier on July 21, 1907. The coastal steamer Columbia collided with the steam schooner San Pedro and sank at an astounding speed, killing 88 people. Like San Juan, Columbia was an iron-hulled steamship constructed in Chester, Pennsylvania during the early 1880s. Columbia's sinking, like that of San Juan, was also thought to have occurred due to structural weaknesses within Columbia's wrought-iron hull.

Inspectors Frank Turner and Joseph Dolan, in charge of the inquiry into the sinking of San Juan, also believed the age of the vessel had little to do with the sinking. Turner stated:

"I do not believe the age of the San Juan had much to do with the foundering. The Titanic was a new vessel and it went down when struck; the Malolo was brand new and it remained afloat when struck on its trial trip ... To compel the owners put in modern double bottoms and other air-tight compartments would have cost more than the steamer was worth."

In the end, the inquiry had a larger focus on the crews of San Juan and S.C.T. Dodd. After interviewing survivors, it became disputed whether the crew acted appropriately towards the disaster or not. Turner claimed that either way, nothing could have been done to help passengers survive the sinking as there was no time for action. First Officer Charles Tulee of San Juan reported a similar statement to the inquiry. The inquiry claimed San Juan had veered off course. Third Officer Robert Papenfuss of San Juan, despite having claimed S.C.T. Dodd had been the ship which veered off course, was found guilty of negligence, leading to his license being revoked. Evidence surfaced after the inquiry's conclusion, showing that S.C.T. Dodd had veered off course rather than San Juan, proving Papenfuss' innocence.

The safety of American steamships was further questioned on September 8, 1934, when the liner Morro Castle caught fire while anchored in a fierce storm off New Jersey. Over 125,000 people watched from the shoreline as Morro Castle burned, killing 130 individuals. Less than two years later, the passenger steamer Mohawk sank following a collision with the Norwegian freighter Talisman off Sea Girt, New Jersey. With shipboard safety becoming a larger issue, the federal government was finally pressured to implement new safety regulations, so as to prevent any more disasters like San Juan, Morro Castle and Mohawk.

By the time the government had acted, the Great Depression mixed with the more widespread usage of automobiles and aircraft, effectively brought an end to shipping along the American west coast. The Los Angeles and San Francisco Navigation Company ceased passenger services in 1937 (which was restricted to the passenger accommodations aboard the freighters Wapama and Celilio). Similarly, other shipping lines such as the Admiral Line and McCormick Steamship Company ended passenger service within the same decade. Today, cruise ships use many of the routes once served by the coastal steamships, although not used for the same purposes.
