= Point Buchon =

Coordinates: 35°15′19″N 120°53′57″W

Point Buchon is a cape in San Luis Obispo County, California. The Point Buchon State Marine Reserve and Marine Conservation Area lies offshore from that Point. Point Buchon was named by the Coast Survey during the Civil War.

Point Buchon was named after El Buchon, the Chumash chief who ruled the area when the Portola expedition passed this way in 1769. El Buchon had a large neck goiter, buchon in 18th century Spanish.
