= San Juan Islander =

Weekly newspaper published in Friday Harbor, Washington, USA

- Type: Weekly newspaper
- Founder: James Cooper Wheeler
- Founded: 1891
- Ceased publication: 1914
- City: Friday Harbor
- Free online archives: Chronicling America

The San Juan Islander (originally the Islander) was a weekly newspaper published every Thursday that covered the San Juan Islands community in Friday Harbor, Washington. Because the San Juan Island community consisted of mostly farmers and fishermen, the newspaper focused on commodity prices, agricultural production, and movements of nearby shipping vessels. Under the name The Islander, the paper was published by James Cooper Wheeler from 1891 to 1899 before being bought by Fred and Otis Culver, who changed its name. The paper was eventually sold to John N. Dickie in 1913 and finally ceased production in 1914. The paper continued to be produced under the name the San Juan Islander from Feb. 24, 1898 to 1914.

The website of the same name has been online since about 1999, and does not appear to have any connection to the original newspaper.
