= San Pedro (steam schooner) =

American steam schooner

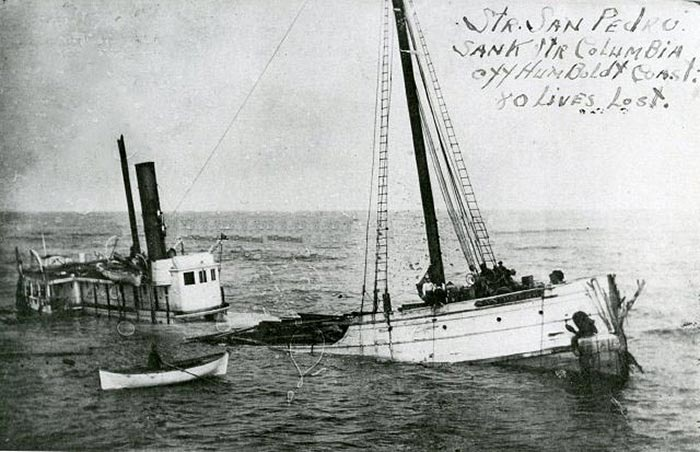
- San Pedro following the collision with the SS Columbia.

History

United States
- Name: San Pedro
- Namesake: San Pedro, California
- Owner: Metropolitan Redwood Lumber Company
- Builder: John Lindstrom's ship yard in Aberdeen, Washington
- Launched: 1899
- Fate: Sank in 1920.
- Notes: Sank the passenger liner Columbia in a collision on 21 July 1907, killing 88 people. Sold to foreign interests shortly before sinking.

General characteristics
- Type: Steam schooner
- Tonnage: 456 Tons
- Notes: First ship built at the Lindstrom shipyard.

The steam schooner San Pedro (1899–1920) was the first vessel constructed by John Lindstrom's shipbuilding yard at Aberdeen, Washington in 1899. She was one of many steam schooners constructed by the yard that year, (which included the Aberdeen, Henry Wilson and W.H. Kruger) and weighed 456 tons. On October 3, 1905, the San Pedro accompanied the tugboat Pomo when the latter was towing the lumber schooner Santa Barbara, damaged by grounding, to Hunter's Point, California.

On July 21, 1907, San Pedro left on a routine trip between Eureka, California and San Pedro, California under the leadership of Captain Magnus Hanson. She was carrying over 390,000 ft (118,872 m) of redwood lumber in her hold along with a large load of railroad ties and fence posts on her deck. Later that night, she became enshrouded in fog off Shelter Cove, California. Captain Hanson retired and left First Officer Ben Hendrickson in charge. Despite the fog, she continued sailing at full steam. Upon hearing a fog whistle from a nearby steamship, Hendrickson immediately changed the San Pedro's course to head out to sea in order to avoid a possible collision. The steamer's whistle grew louder as the San Pedro continued heading out to sea.

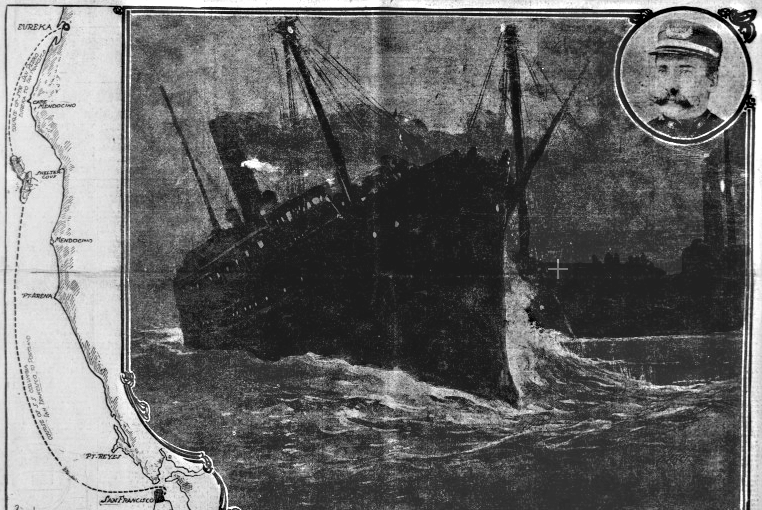
Illustration of the Columbia sinking after colliding with the San Pedro. The San Pedro is visible to the right of Columbia.

Fifteen minutes after the first blast was heard, the steamer let out two whistle blasts indicating it would be passing San Pedro. The whistles were heard off the San Pedro's port bow and sounded dangerously close. Worried, Hendrickson ordered the San Pedro to give out four blasts signaling danger. Shortly afterwards, the steamer appeared 150 ft (46 m) in front of the San Pedro and revealed herself to be the 2,721 ton passenger liner Columbia. The two vessels collided at 12:22 AM on July 21, 1907. San Pedro was left partially sunk with a noticeable list. The large cargo of redwood kept the schooner afloat.

Re-taking charge of his ship, Captain Hanson realized his vessel would stay afloat and immediately turned his attention to the stricken Columbia. The passenger liner had a large hole in her starboard side causing her to list towards starboard and begin sinking by the bow. Realizing the Columbia was going to sink, Captain Hanson ordered all of San Pedro's lifeboats to assist in rescuing Columbia's survivors. Eight and a half minutes after the collision, Columbia made her final plunge, killing 88 people. 80 of Columbia's survivors were brought on board the San Pedro, where they had to hold on to one another so as not to be washed overboard. Eventually, the steamers Roanoke and George W. Elder arrived to pick up any remaining survivors. The George W. Elder removed the 80 survivors from the San Pedro and towed the lumber schooner to Safe Harbor, California.

Following the disaster, San Pedro was repaired and reconstructed. She continued to sail the California coastline until 1920, when she was sold to foreign interests. Sometime after this sale, the San Pedro apparently sank.

Additional media
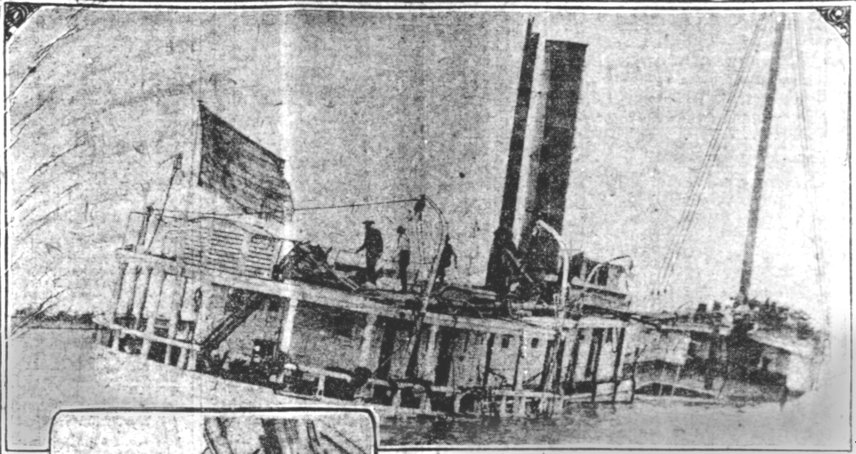
Stern view of San Pedro following the accident.

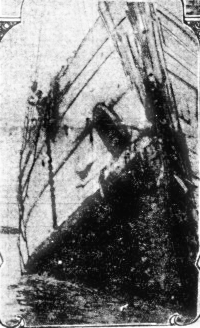
Damage sustained on San Pedro's bow from the collision.
