= Shelter Cove, California =

- Census-designated place
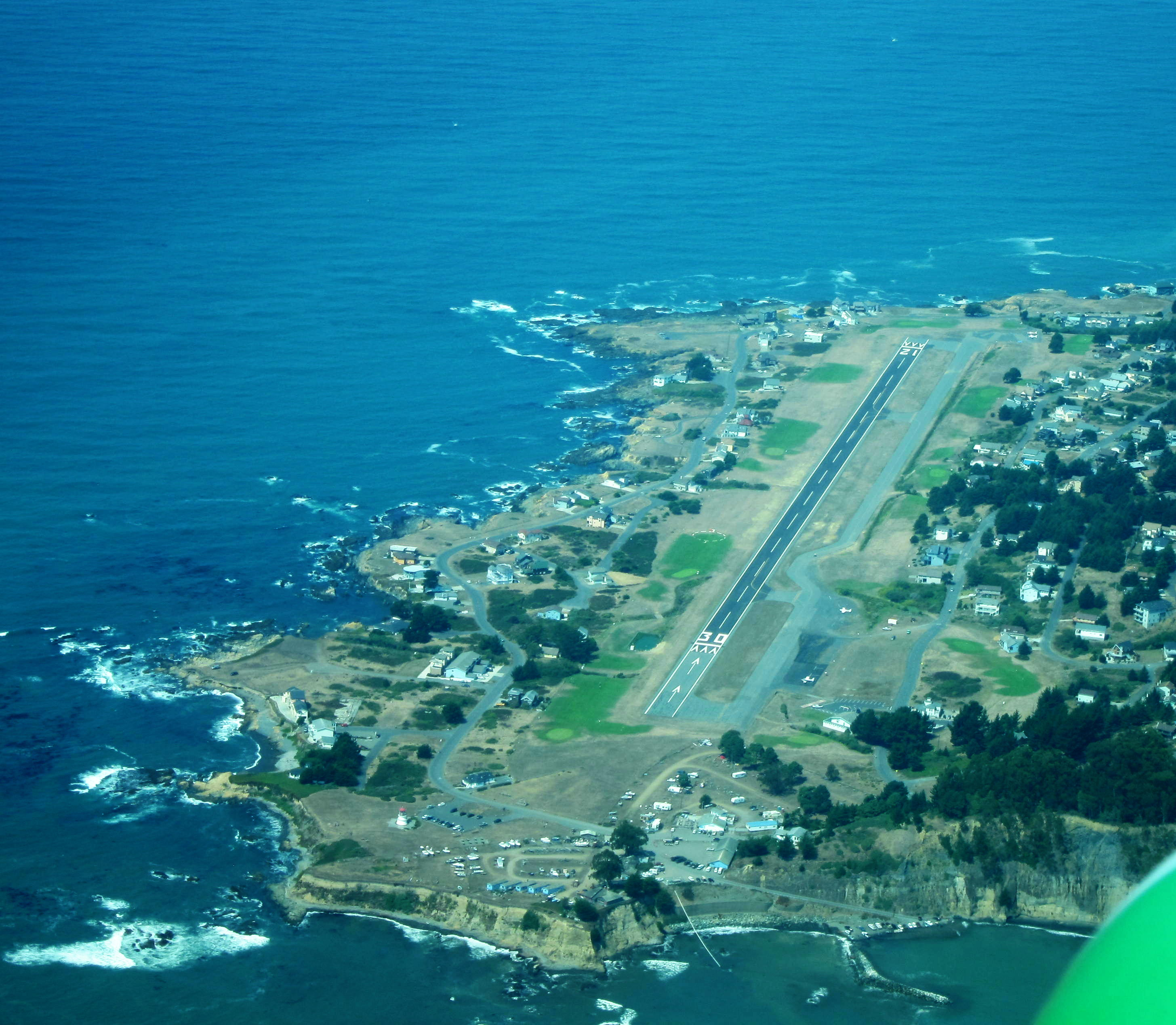
- Aerial view of Shelter Cove

- Location in Humboldt County and the state of California

- Location in the United States
- Coordinates: 40°01′50″N 124°04′23″W
- Country: United States
- State: California
- County: Humboldt County

Area
  - Total: 5.829 sq mi (15.098 km^{2})
  - Land: 5.829 sq mi (15.098 km^{2})
  - Water: 0 sq mi (0 km^{2}) 0%
- Elevation: 138 ft (42 m)

Population (2020)
  - Total: 803
  - Density: 138/sq mi (53.2/km^{2})
- Time zone: UTC-08:00 (PST)
  - Summer (DST): UTC-07:00 (PDT)
- ZIP Code: 95589
- Area code: 707
- GNIS feature IDs: 1659640; 2611448

Shelter Cove is a census-designated place in Humboldt County, California, United States. It lies at an elevation of 138 feet (42 m). Shelter Cove is on California's Lost Coast where the King Range meets the Pacific Ocean. A nine-hole golf course surrounds the one-runway Shelter Cove Airport at the center of Shelter Cove's commercial district. Utilities are provided by the Resort Improvement District #1 and boating access to the sea is managed by the Humboldt Bay Harbor, Recreation & Conservation District. The population was 803 at the 2020 census.

Shelter Cove shares a ZIP code (95589) with the hamlet of Whitethorn, California, located to the southeast. The community is inside telephone area code 707. Sinkyone Wilderness State Park is about 22 miles (35 km) south of Shelter Cove on the coast. There are also parks such as Black Sands Beach, Mal Coombs Park, Seal Rock Picnic Area, and Abalone Point. Much of the land around Shelter Cove is in the King Range National Conservation Area, managed by the Bureau of Land Management. Cove amenities include hiking trails, deli, coffee shop, restaurants, multiple inns, a general store, and gift shops. Other amenities in Shelter Cove include a small aircraft airstrip, a boat launch, and recreational vehicle parking. Some services not available in Shelter Cove are in the towns of Redway and Garberville on the U.S. 101 corridor, about 20 miles (32 km) of winding county road to the east.

== History ==
The area around Shelter Cove was originally home to Native Americans known as the Sinkyone people.

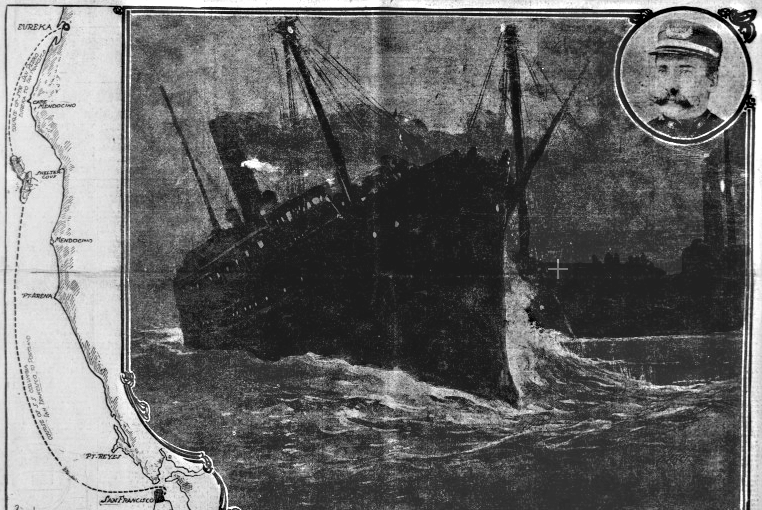
An illustration of the collision between the Columbia and San Pedro near Shelter Cove on July 21, 1907

Near Shelter Cove on July 21, 1907, the coastal passenger steamer Columbia collided with the steam schooner San Pedro amidst dense fog. The Columbia subsequently sank, killing 88 people. Although badly damaged, San Pedro stayed afloat and helped to rescue Columbia's survivors.

Because of the very steep terrain on the coastal areas surrounding Shelter Cove, the highway builders constructing State Route 1 (the "Shoreline Highway") decided it was too difficult to build the coastal highway along a long stretch of what is now known as the Lost Coast. As a result, the small fishing village of Shelter Cove remained secluded from the rest of the state, despite being only 230 miles (370 km) north of San Francisco, and is accessible by boat, by paved mountain road, or by the small Shelter Cove Airport.

As a result of its seclusion, the Shelter Cove area has become popular for those seeking a quiet vacation respite or retirement area. Popular activities include fishing, whale watching, hiking, diving for abalone, and other outdoor activities.

The Cape Mendocino Light, a lighthouse from Cape Mendocino, was moved by helicopter to Mal Coombs Park in 1998. A post office operated at Shelter Cove from 1892 to 1933, moving in 1898.

== Demographics ==
Historical population
Census	Pop.	Note	%±
2010	693		—
2020	803		15.9%
U.S. Decennial Census; 1860–1870 1880-1890; 1900 1910 1920; 1930 1940 1950; 1960 1970 1980; 1990 2000 2010

Shelter Cove first appeared as a census designated place in the 2010 U.S. census.

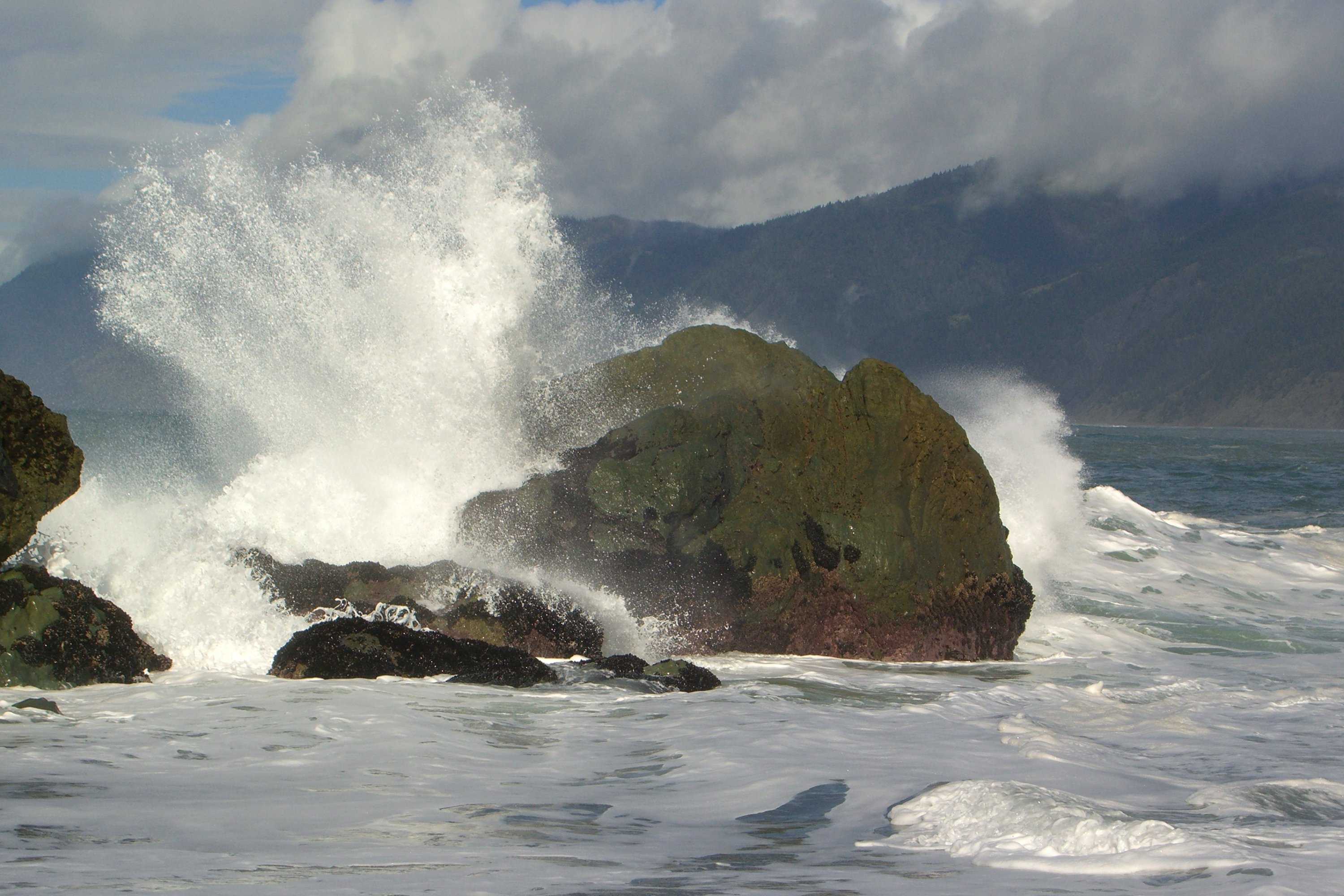
Stormy weather in Shelter Cove

The 2020 United States census reported that Shelter Cove had a population of 803. The population density was 137.8 inhabitants per square mile (53.2/km^{2}). The racial makeup of Shelter Cove was 636 (79.2%) White, 4 (0.5%) African American, 19 (2.4%) Native American, 10 (1.2%) Asian, 0 (0.0%) Pacific Islander, 28 (3.5%) from other races, and 106 (13.2%) from two or more races. Hispanic or Latino of any race were 77 persons (9.6%).

The census reported that 793 people (98.8% of the population) lived in households, 10 (1.2%) lived in non-institutionalized group quarters, and no one was institutionalized.

There were 406 households, out of which 63 (15.5%) had children under the age of 18 living in them, 142 (35.0%) were married-couple households, 45 (11.1%) were cohabiting couple households, 102 (25.1%) had a female householder with no partner present, and 117 (28.8%) had a male householder with no partner present. 162 households (39.9%) were one person, and 59 (14.5%) were one person aged 65 or older. The average household size was 1.95. There were 198 families (48.8% of all households).

The age distribution was 112 people (13.9%) under the age of 18, 43 people (5.4%) aged 18 to 24, 203 people (25.3%) aged 25 to 44, 235 people (29.3%) aged 45 to 64, and 210 people (26.2%) who were 65 years of age or older. The median age was 48.8 years. For every 100 females, there were 119.4 males.

There were 665 housing units at an average density of 114.1 units per square mile (44.1 units/km^{2}), of which 406 (61.1%) were occupied. Of these, 308 (75.9%) were owner-occupied, and 98 (24.1%) were occupied by renters.

== Politics ==
In the state legislature, Shelter Cove is in the 2nd senatorial district, represented by Democrat Mike McGuire, and the 2nd Assembly district, represented by Democrat Chris Rogers.

Federally, Shelter Cove is in California's 2nd congressional district, represented by Democrat Jared Huffman.

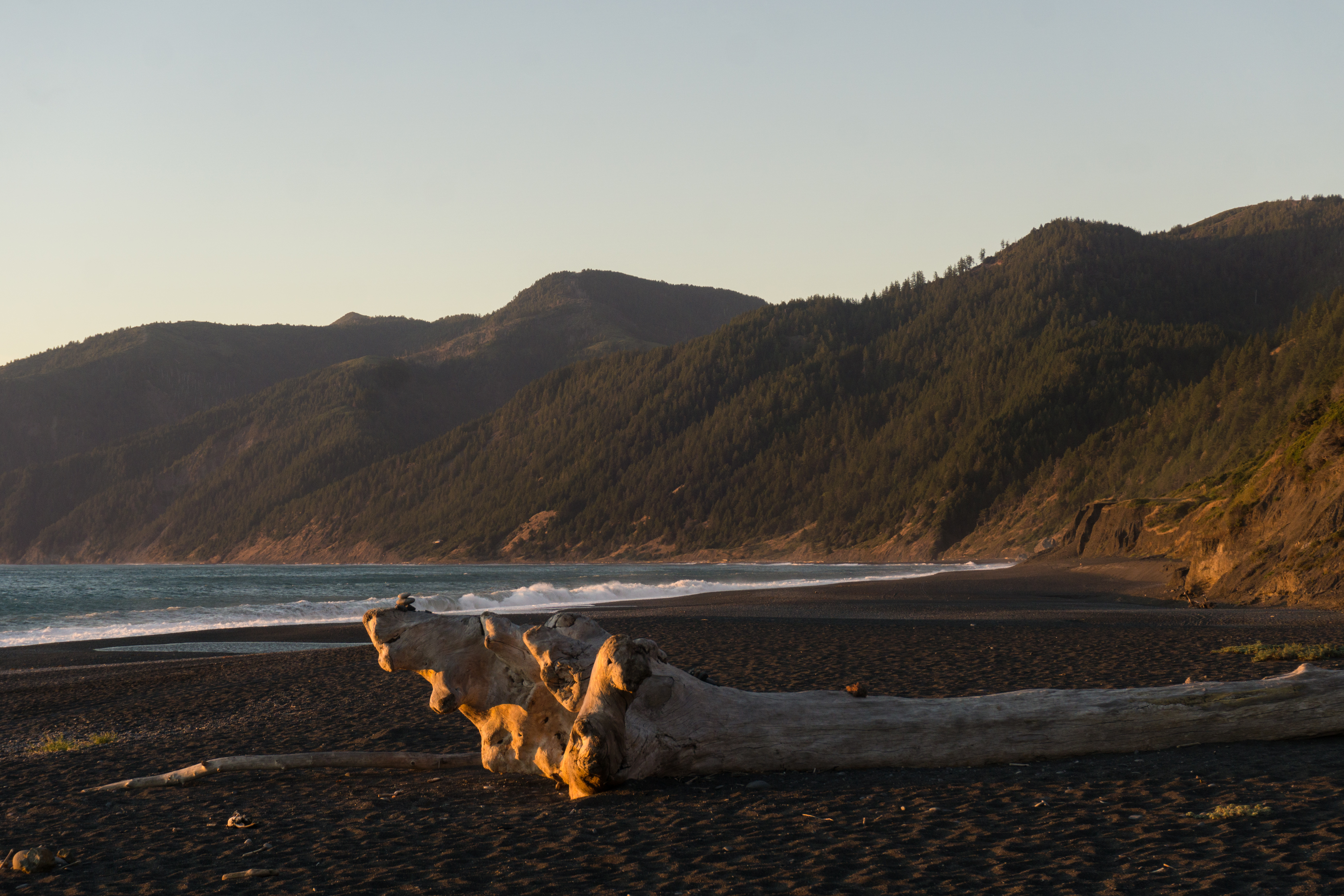
Black Sands Beach, Shelter Cove, 2019

== Climate ==
Shelter Cove has a warm-summer Mediterranean climate (Köppen: Csb) typical of the North Coast, that is characterized by warm (but not hot), dry summers, and mild to chilly, rainy winters. Shelter Cove's climate is moderated by the proximity to the Pacific Ocean, with small temperature variations on average throughout the year, which result in mild year-round temperatures, although some winter months can get cool at times. Average high temperatures range from 58 °F (14 °C) in January to 70 °F (21 °C) in September. Shelter Cove on average has wet winters and dry summers, also representative of the region. Temperatures above 32 °C (90 °F) are rare, happening on average 1–2 times per season, but temperatures approaching 34 °C (93 °F) or above have been measured over such a wide time period as from April to October. For being a coastal community north of the San Francisco Bay Area, Shelter Cove has mild winter temperatures and warm summers.

Climate data for Shelter Cove
Month	Jan	Feb	Mar	Apr	May	Jun	Jul	Aug	Sep	Oct	Nov	Dec	Year
Record high °F (°C)	74 (23)	83 (28)	76 (24)	83 (28)	88 (31)	96 (36)	88 (31)	85 (29)	90 (32)	86 (30)	83 (28)	78 (26)	96 (36)
Mean daily maximum °F (°C)	57.7 (14.3)	58.0 (14.4)	59.6 (15.3)	61.2 (16.2)	65.3 (18.5)	68.6 (20.3)	69.4 (20.8)	69.0 (20.6)	69.8 (21.0)	67.2 (19.6)	61.4 (16.3)	58.2 (14.6)	63.8 (17.7)
Daily mean °F (°C)	51.7 (10.9)	51.8 (11.0)	52.6 (11.4)	53.7 (12.1)	57.1 (13.9)	60.0 (15.6)	61.1 (16.2)	61.0 (16.1)	61.3 (16.3)	59.3 (15.2)	54.8 (12.7)	52.3 (11.3)	56.4 (13.6)
Mean daily minimum °F (°C)	45.6 (7.6)	45.6 (7.6)	45.7 (7.6)	46.1 (7.8)	48.9 (9.4)	51.5 (10.8)	52.8 (11.6)	53.0 (11.7)	52.9 (11.6)	51.4 (10.8)	48.3 (9.1)	46.5 (8.1)	49.0 (9.4)
Record low °F (°C)	31 (−1)	34 (1)	31 (−1)	38 (3)	42 (6)	44 (7)	36 (2)	43 (6)	42 (6)	40 (4)	35 (2)	27 (−3)	27 (−3)
Average precipitation inches (mm)	10.02 (255)	8.75 (222)	7.79 (198)	4.63 (118)	2.98 (76)	1.34 (34)	0.21 (5.3)	0.63 (16)	0.88 (22)	4.02 (102)	8.03 (204)	12.71 (323)	61.99 (1,575.3)
Average snowfall inches (cm)	0 (0)	0.1 (0.25)	0 (0)	0 (0)	0 (0)	0 (0)	0 (0)	0 (0)	0 (0)	0 (0)	0 (0)	0 (0)	0.1 (0.25)
Average precipitation days	14.2	12.7	12.3	9.0	6.2	2.7	0.8	1.7	2.7	6.3	12.4	14.9	95.9
Average snowy days	0	0.1	0	0	0	0	0	0	0	0	0	0	0.1
Mean monthly sunshine hours	156.5	152.4	201.2	271.0	322.5	339.6	367.4	365.7	312.2	206.1	178.1	149.2	3,021.9
Mean daily sunshine hours	5.1	5.4	6.5	9.0	10.4	11.3	11.8	11.8	10.4	6.7	5.9	4.8	8.3
Mean daily daylight hours	10.2	11.2	12.5	13.8	14.9	15.5	15.2	14.2	12.9	11.6	10.4	9.9	12.7
Average ultraviolet index	3	3	3	4	4	5	5	5	5	4	3	3	4
Source 1:
Source 2:

== See also ==
- SS Columbia (1880)
