= Wetland conservation in the United States =

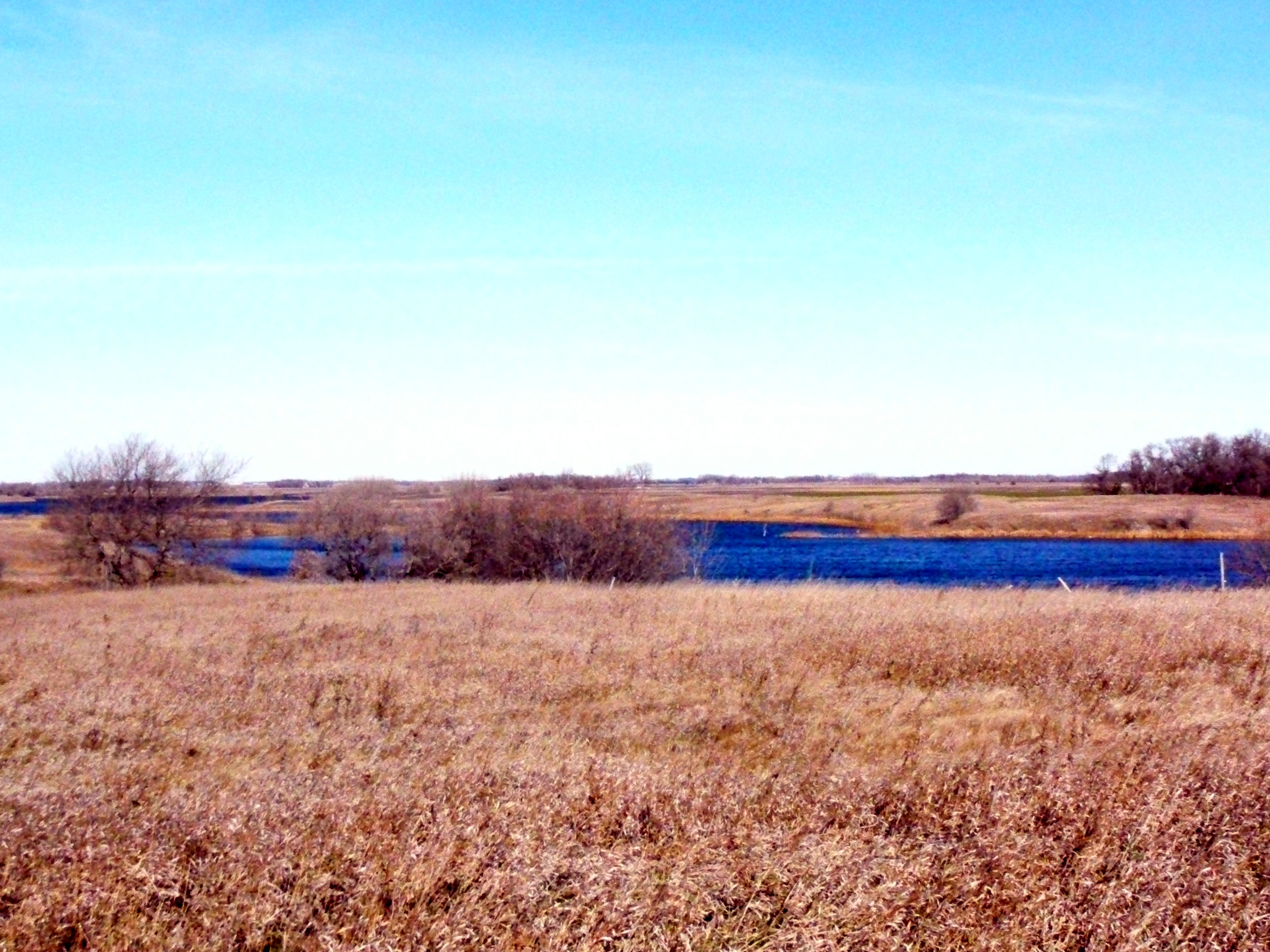
A large wetland in western Minnesota.

Over the past 200 years, the United States has lost more than 50% of its wetlands. And even with the current focus on wetland conservation, the US is losing about 60,000 acres (240 km^{2}) of wetlands per year (as of 2004). However, from 1998 to 2004 the United States managed a net gain of 191,750 acres (776.0 km^{2}) of wetlands (mostly freshwater). The past several decades have seen an increasing number of laws and regulations regarding wetlands, their surroundings, and their inhabitants, creating protections through several different outlets. Some of the most important have been and are the Migratory Bird Act, Swampbuster, and the Clean Water Act.

== Legislation ==
Some of the laws and regulations with notable impact on wetland conservation are:

- Migratory Bird Conservation Act, ch. 257, 45 Stat. 1222, (1929)

Established a commission to approve the acquisition of migratory bird habitat.

- Rivers and Harbors Act, 52 Stat. 802, (1938)

Provides that "due regard" be given to wildlife conservation in planning Federal water projects.

- Watershed Protection and Flood Prevention Act, Pub. L. 83–566, (1954)
- Fish and Wildlife Coordination Act (1956)

Authorizes the development and distribution of fish and wildlife information and the development of policies and procedures relating to fish and wildlife.

- Federal Water Project Recreation Act, Pub. L. 89–72,(1965)

Recreation and fish and wildlife enhancement must be considered by Federal water projects. Authorizes Federal funds for acquiring land for waterfowl refuges.

- National Wildlife Refuge Acts (1966, improvement amended 1997)

Numerous statutes establish refuges, many of which contain significant wetland acreage.

- National Environmental Policy Act, Pub. L. 91–190, (1969)

Requires the preparation of an environmental impact statement of all major Federal actions significantly affecting the environment

- Federal Water Pollution Control, Pub. L. 92–500,(Clean Water Act), Section 404 (1972)

Regulates many activities that involve the disposal of dredged and fill materials in waters of the United States, including many wetlands.

- Ramsar Convention (Treaty), (adopted 1971, enforced from 1975)

Convention maintains a list of wetlands of international importance and encourages the wise use of wetlands.

- Executive Order 11988 & 11990, Protection of Floodplains/Wetlands, (1977)

Requires Federal agencies to minimize impacts of Federal activities on floodplains/wetlands.

- Food Security Act (Swampbuster), Pub. L. 99–198, (1985)

"Swampbuster" program suspends agricultural subsidies for farmers who convert wetlands to agriculture.

- U.S. Tax Code Reform Act, Pub. L. 99–514, (1986)

Eliminates incentives for clearing land. Deductible conservation expenditures must be consistent with wetlands protection. Capital gains on converted wetlands treated as income.

- New Jersey Freshwater Wetlands Protection Act, New Jersey (July 1, 1987)

To preserve the purity and integrity of freshwater wetlands from unnecessary and undesirable disturbance.

- North American Wetlands Conservation Act, (1989)

Provides matching grants to organizations and individuals who have developed partnerships to carry out wetlands conservation projects in the United States, Canada, and Mexico for the benefit of waterfowl and other wetland-dependent migratory birds.

- Food, Agriculture, Conservation, and Trade Act, Pub. L. 101–624, (1990)

Wetland Reserve Program purchases perpetual non-development easements on farmed wetlands. Subsidizes restoration of croplands to wetlands.

== National Agencies ==
There are a number of government agencies in the United States that are in some way concerned with the protection of wetlands. The top five are the Army Corps of Engineers (ACoE), Natural Resources Conservation Service (NRCS), Fish and Wildlife Service (FWS), National Oceanic and Atmospheric Administration (NOAA), and the Environmental Protection Agency (EPA). They each oversee a different aspect of wetlands conservation, from funding other groups or individuals, to regulating wetland use, to establishing new areas for wetlands restoration.

== State level ==
Most states of the US have their own set of agencies that also oversee some wetland conservation. These are usually in the form of something like a Department of Natural Resources (DNR) or Fish and Game Department. These groups typically control licensing, hunting limits, prairie

== Private ==
There are many private groups that practice wetlands conservation. The largest of these players is Ducks Unlimited, as they are one of a few focused nearly entirely on wetlands. Their mission statement is:

Ducks Unlimited conserves, restores, and manages wetlands and associated habitats for North America's waterfowl. These habitats also benefit other wildlife and people.

They have conserved more than 12,000,000 acres (49,000 km^{2}) of wetlands in North America and influenced another 47,000,000 acres (190,000 km^{2}). The Nature Conservancy, Audubon Society, and Pheasants Forever are a few more of the large private groups that focus part of their time and resources on wetlands conservation. Individuals should not be overlooked in their contributions, as they are often the most direct route to protecting and restoring wetlands.

== Conservation strategies ==
Nearly all wetland conservation work is done through one of 4 channels. They consist of easements, land purchase, revolving land, and monetary funding. Conservation easements can meet the needs of interested owners of working farms, ranches, timberlands, sporting properties and recreational lands, who wish to protect valuable natural resources while retaining ownership of the property. In locations where wildlife habitat has been degraded & the land is for sale, DU will seek to acquire it. Once purchased, the habitat will be restored and easements will be placed on land to perpetually protect resource values. In special cases, where intact waterfowl habitat is at imminent risk or of high importance, groups or individuals may seek to acquire the property instead. Once purchased, the habitat is restored and can be entered into easements to ensure their continued protection or be kept in their ownership. Monetary funding exists most often as a subsidy, grant, or tax-break from the government. Instead of doing all the work and labor themselves, they seek to encourage others to take on those tasks themselves. All of these methods are important to ensuring protection for wetlands, now and in the future.

== See also ==
- Conservation in the United States
- Partners for Fish and Wildlife
- Wetland conservation
- Wetlands of the United States
