= Sandy Point Island =

Island off New England, United States

Coordinates: 41°19′44″N 71°53′30″W

Sandy Point Island (more commonly referred to as Sandy Point) is a 35-acre (14 ha) island in Little Narragansett Bay, lying mostly in Westerly, Rhode Island and partly in Stonington, Connecticut. Once an extension of Napatree Point, Sandy Point is now a one-mile-long (1.6 km) island that serves as an important nature preserve and recreation site. Sandy Point is the westernmost piece of land in the state of Rhode Island.

== History ==
Before the Great September Gale of 1815, Sandy Point was the farthest extension of Napatree Point, forming a small, sickle-shaped peninsula on the western edge of Watch Hill, Rhode Island. Following the storm, virtually all of the trees on the once-forested peninsula were destroyed, allowing the coastal vegetation to occupy the landscape.

Even during the period when it was connected to the mainland, Sandy Point was never built upon. Fort Mansfield, situated at the elbow of the peninsula, marked the end of the developed portion of the land. In 1926, following the closure of the fort, the federal government put Fort Mansfield and all the land beyond it (that is, Sandy Point) up for sale. A New York developer proposed Sandy Point be subdivided into 674 lots and in response a syndicate of Watch Hill residents purchased the land to prevent the construction of the "cheap little houses" that might change the exclusive character of their village.

Prior to the 1938 Hurricane making landfall on the Northeastern United States, Napatree and Sandy Points formed a single peninsula. When the hurricane struck the coast, it destroyed all the houses on Napatree Point and cut several channels into the peninsula. Only one of those channels proved to be permanent; that breach separated Sandy Point from Napatree Point just beyond the site of the former fort. To this day Sandy Point remains an island, leaving Napatree Point as the westernmost point on mainland Rhode Island.

In 1940, Sandy Point was deeded to Alfred Gildersleeve of Stonington, Connecticut. The Gildersleeve family gave Sandy Point to the Avalonia Land Conservancy in 1982 to be protected and used as a nature preserve.

== Geography and geology ==
The present, shifting geography of the 35-acre (14 ha) island is the result of the 1938 Hurricane and the process of longshore drift. Sandy Point Island is a slender, one-mile-long (1.6 km) barrier beach in Little Narragansett Bay, an estuary of the Pawcatuck River in Fishers Island Sound. It lies about one mile north of Napatree Point, with very shallow waters in the area where the two were once connected.

The island is low-lying and geologically similar to Napatree Point. The northern and southern ends provide a dune habitat covered in beachgrass, shrubs, and a few trees. The middle of the island is a sandy washover area, with sparse (yet locally-rare) sand plain vegetation. Tidal flats extend into Little Narragansett Bay on both the bay and ocean sides of the island.

Aside from a few tiny dunes, the topography of the island is generally flat. Since its separation from Napatree Point, Sandy Point Island has been migrating in a northwestern direction; the northernmost five acres now lie within the boundaries of Connecticut, with the remaining thirty acres still in Rhode Island.

== Sandy Point Nature Preserve ==
Following the Avalonia Land Conservancy's acquisition of the island in 1982, Sandy Point has served an important ecological role for wildlife in the region. It mainly serves as a place of refuge and a breeding ground for shoreline birds such as the piping plover, American oystercatcher, least tern, and several species of gulls. A large number of horseshoe crabs also come to the island to breed.

The Avalonia Land Conservancy sought assistance from the U.S. Fish & Wildlife Service in 2009 to more effectively manage the preserve for the endangered shorebirds which nest there. In 2015, the Fish and Wildlife Service began its partnership with the Avalonia Land Conservancy in earnest, with the intention of incorporating Sandy Point into the refuge boundary of the Stewart B. McKinney National Wildlife Refuge. The property is currently managed by the Rhode Island National Wildlife Refuge Complex through the Partners for Fish and Wildlife program, which allows the Avalonia Land Conservancy to maintain ownership of the island and benefit from the management expertise of the USFWS.

=== Public Access ===
Sandy Point Island has been a popular recreation site for boaters and beachgoers who enjoy its soft sand and shallow waters. Striking a balance between conservation and public use of the property has been a primary focus of the Avalonia Land Conservancy and the USFWS over the last several years. Currently, the public is permitted to access those portions of the island on which birds are not nesting. Each year, once the birds have chosen sites for their nests, nesting areas are roped off during the breeding season (typically the northern and southern tips of the island, as well as a portion of the sandy middle). The remainder of the island is left open to the public, with the purchase of a permit to visit the site required from Memorial Day to Labor Day.

Despite some initial opposition, increased educational outreach has led most Sandy Point visitors to accept the island's dual-purpose vocation and respect the boundaries established each year for nesting shorebirds. The Fish & Wildlife Service has installed informational kiosks on the northern and southern ends of the island, and rangers often walk the island to monitor the wildlife and engage the public.

As an island with no dock, Sandy Point can be somewhat difficult to access. The island is most easily reached by kayak or by a boat with a shallow draft. Larger boats can also be taken to the island, but boaters must drop anchor offshore and then row or swim to the beach.

== See also ==
- Napatree Point
- Little Narragansett Bay
- 1938 New England Hurricane
- U.S. Fish & Wildlife Service
