= Napatree Point =

Southwesternmost point of mainland Rhode Island

Coordinates: 41.316884°N 71.873932°W

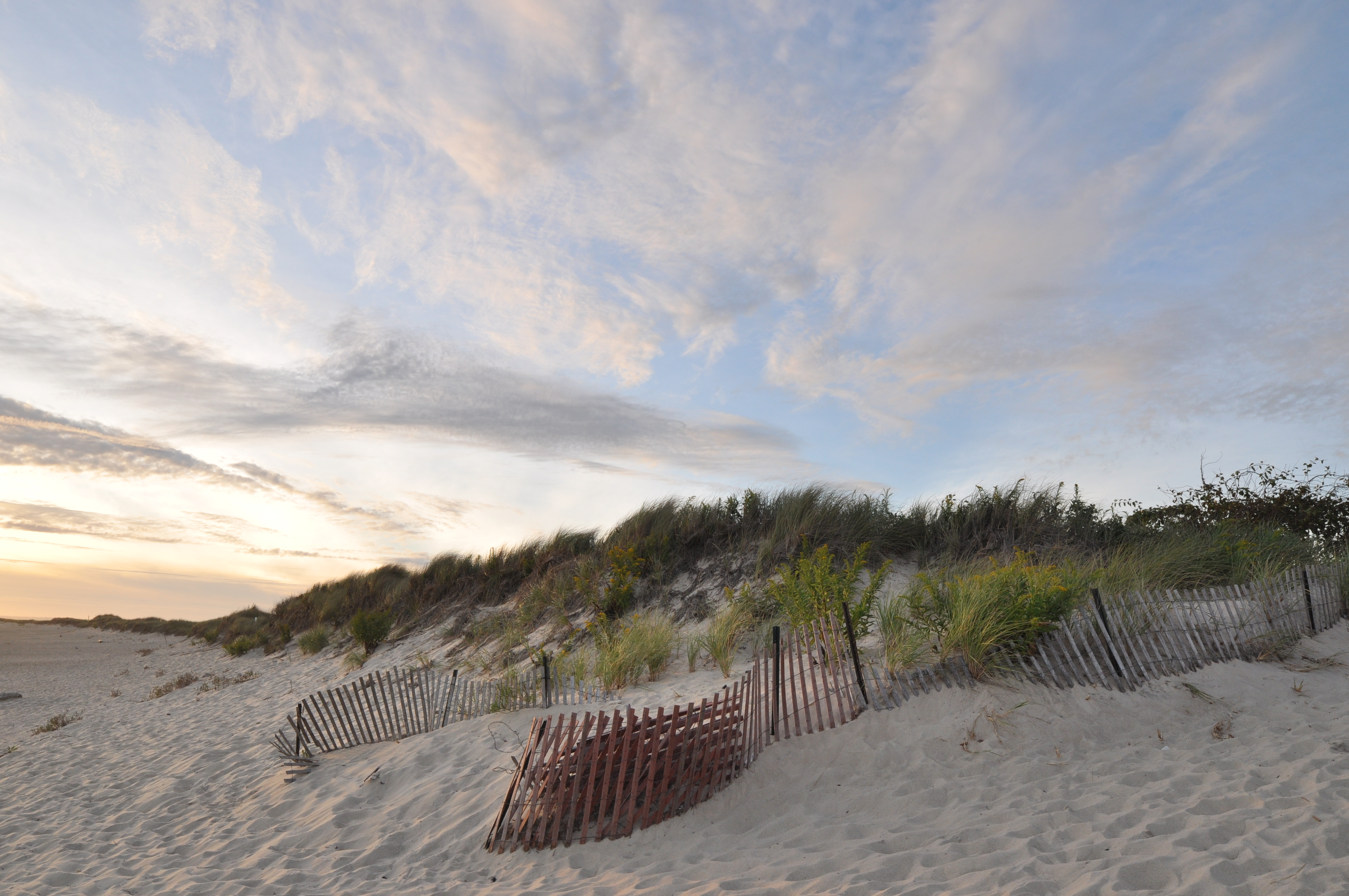
Dunes along Napatree Point at sunset

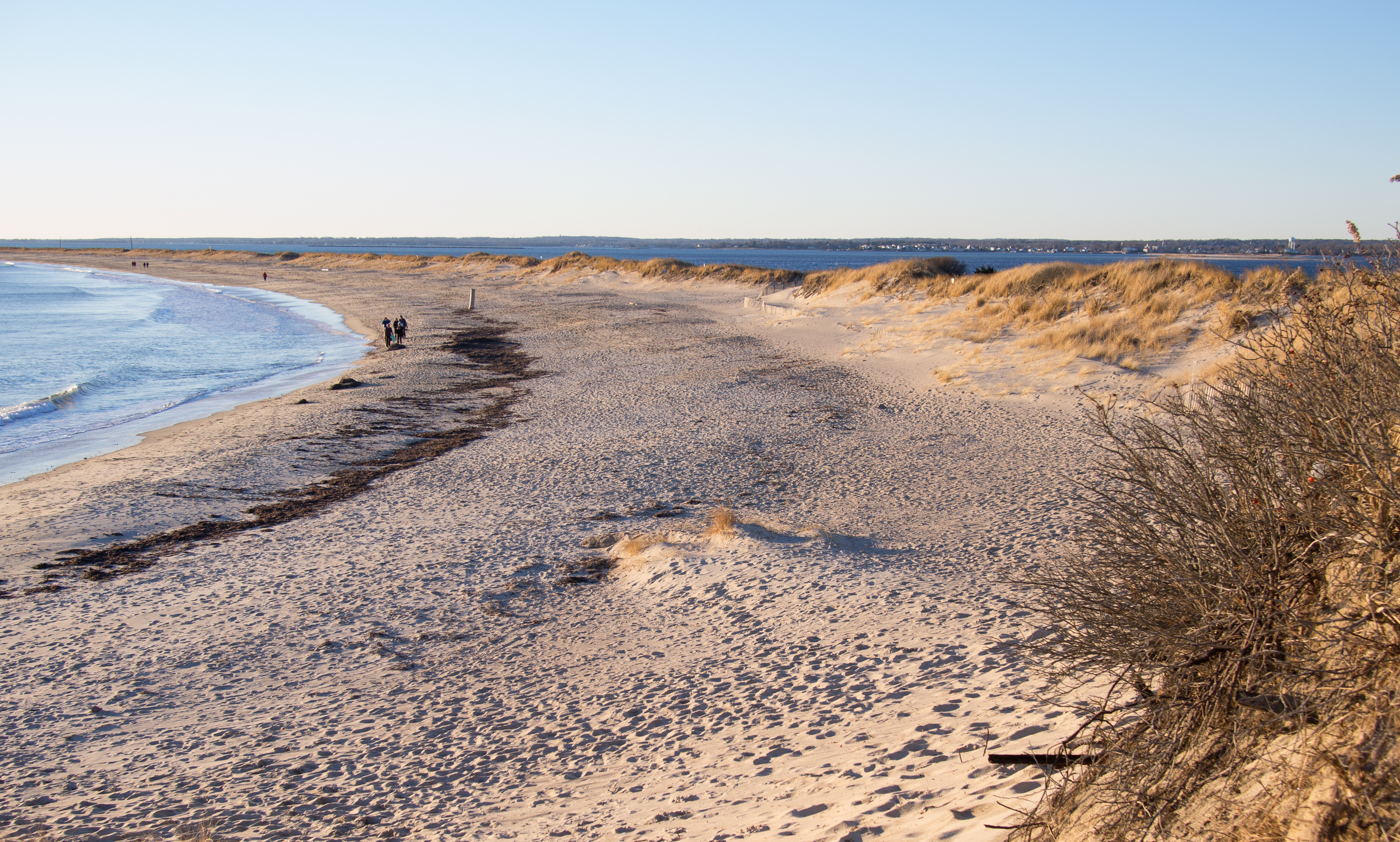
Beach on the south side of the peninsula, facing west

Napatree Point is the southernmost and westernmost point of mainland Rhode Island. Often referred to simply as Napatree, it is a long sandy spit created by a geologic process called longshore drift. Up until the Hurricane of 1938, Napatree was 3 mi (4.8 km) and sickle-shaped and included a 1.5 mi (2.4 km) long northern extension called Sandy Point, today an island. Napatree now extends 1.5 mi (2.4 km) westward from the business district of Watch Hill, a village in Westerly, Rhode Island, forming a protected harbor.

== Name origin ==
The name "Napatree" is derived from Nap or Nape (Neck) of Trees. Napatree Point was once heavily wooded. However, most of the trees were destroyed when the Great September Gale of 1815 struck the area.

== Geography and geology ==
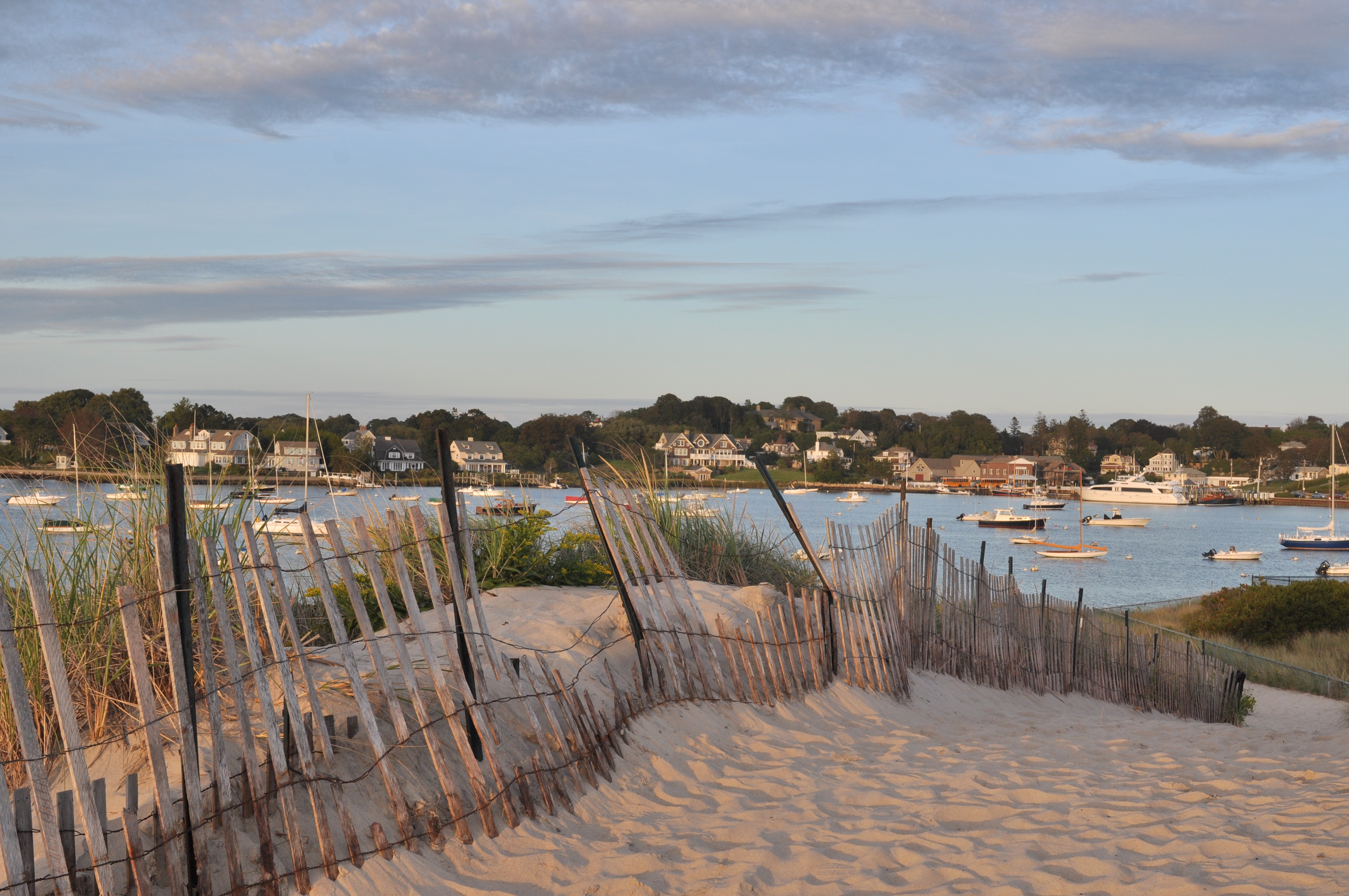
Watch Hill and Watch Hill Cove from the eastern end of Napatree Point

Napatree Point is a slender, 1.5 mile long peninsula in Block Island Sound. To the north of the peninsula is Little Narragansett Bay, a small estuary draining the Pawcatuck River into the Atlantic Ocean.

The peninsula is partially made from longshore drift. It is also made from glacial moraine, and is similar in makeup to nearby Fishers Island. The same moraine that Fishers Island is made out of resurfaces in Watch Hill, which Napatree Point is part of. The island of this region of the Northeastern United States made by glacial moraines from the Wisconsonian glaciation are known as the Outer Lands.

== History ==
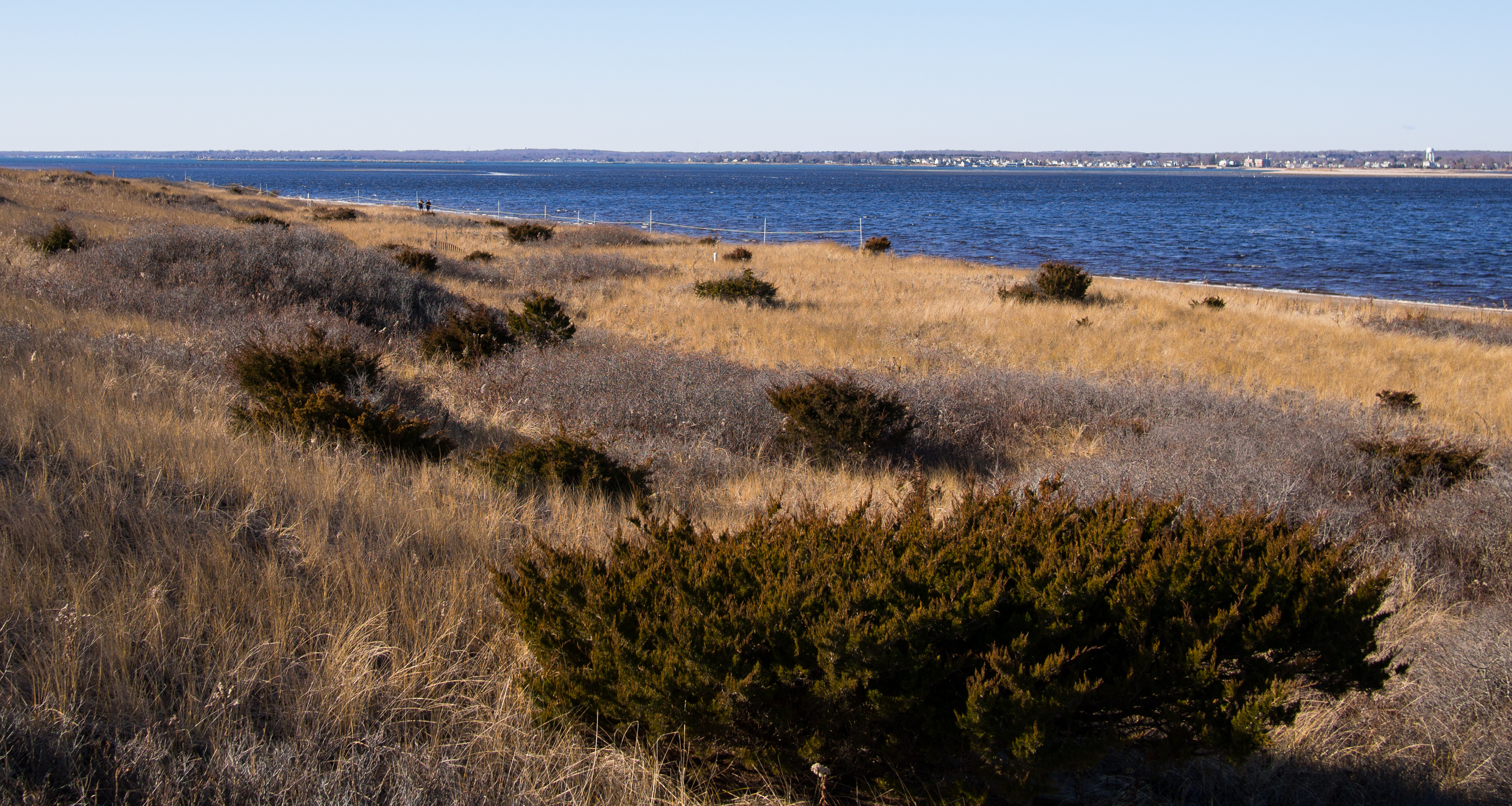
Looking across the field on the north side of the peninsula, from the center, facing northwest

In 1898, the federal government purchased 60 acres (24 ha) at the elbow of Napatree Point for the construction of a coastal artillery installation, one of many such forts designed to protect the eastern entrance to Long Island Sound as part of a defense network for New York City. Fort Mansfield began operations in 1901. However, war games in 1907 demonstrated a fatal design flaw, and by 1909 it was removed from the list of active posts.

In 1926, the government put the land up for sale. A New York developer proposed that Sandy Point be subdivided into 674 lots. A private syndicate of Watch Hill residents mobilized to prevent the construction of "cheap little houses" and protect the exclusive character of their town. The purchase was finalized in 1928, and all government buildings at Fort Mansfield were demolished that winter. Today, all that remains are the three concrete gun emplacements. The syndicate was unable to meet mortgage payments and the land was foreclosed on by the Washington Trust Company in 1931.

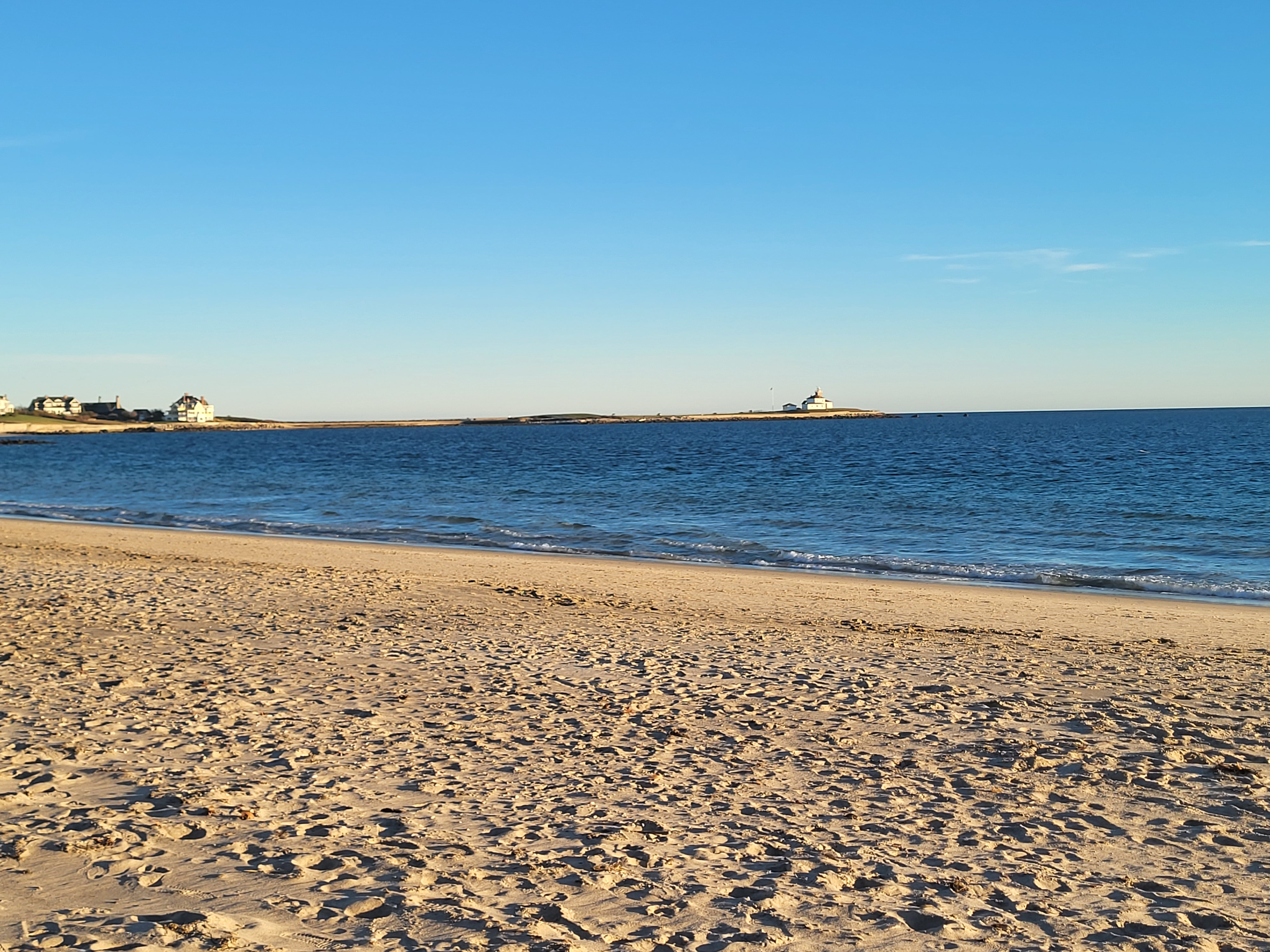
Photo taken from the south side of the Napatree Point peninsula facing southeast. In the far distance is the historic Watch Hill Lighthouse (sole white building located on right half of photograph).

The Hurricane of 1938 caught New England by surprise. Forty-two people were in their Fort Road homes on Napatree when the hurricane struck, and 15 died. The storm demolished all the homes built on Napatree as well as one of the Fort Mansfield gun emplacements. It created several breaches in the spit. The first of these breachways was near the current beach club bathhouses. At least three more broke the connection between Sandy Point and Napatree Point, severing it from the mainland. Sandy Point is now an island in Little Narragansett Bay. Erosion by the sea has caused the Napatree beach line to retreat some 200 feet since the mid-1930s.

In 1940, the Sandy Point portion was deeded to Alfred Guildersleeve of Stonington, Connecticut. In 1945, the remainder of the land was sold to the Watch Hill Fire District for $10,000.

== Conservation ==
Napatree Point is now a wildlife preserve - home to deer, fox, osprey, and migratory birds - and a popular public beach. It is protected by the Watch Hill Conservancy and Fire District and patrolled by its rangers, who also work with the U.S. Fish and Wildlife Service to protect the piping plover, a federally endangered species.

== In film ==
In 2006, a scene from the movie Dan in Real Life was filmed at Napatree Point.
