= Little Narragansett Bay =

American inlet and estuary

Coordinates: 41°19′12″N 71°51′57″W

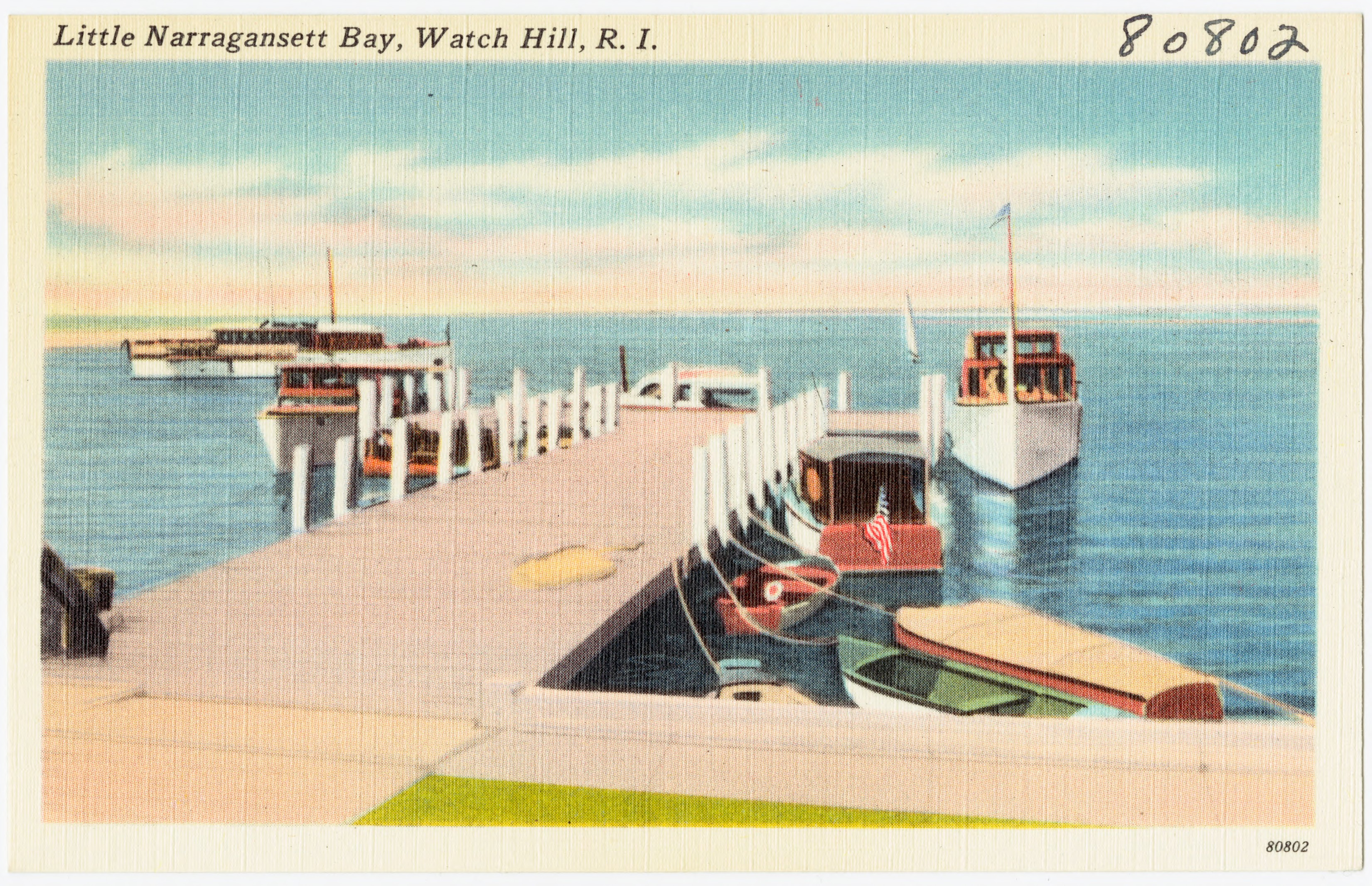
Little Narragansett Bay, Watch Hill, R.I.

Little Narragansett Bay is an inlet of the Atlantic Ocean and an estuary of the Pawcatuck River on the Rhode Island–Connecticut state line. It is sheltered by the curving peninsula of Napatree Point.

At the base of Napatree Point is the resort village of Watch Hill, Rhode Island. The bay also contains the islands of Sandy Point, Elihu Island, and Barn Island. Sandy Point was once part of Napatree Point until the two were separated by the Hurricane of 1938. Since that time, it has migrated north and west, and changed orientation. It now begins about 1/4 mile east of Stonington Borough, and runs approximately 1 1/2 miles east-southeast.

== History ==
In 1662, Connecticut's royal charter delineated the easternmost border of the state as Narragansett Bay. However, a 1663 royal charter defined the western border of Rhode Island as the Pawcatuck River, which lies west of Narragansett Bay. In order to resolve the conflicting definitions, King Charles renamed the Pawcatuck River to "Little Narragansett Bay". Connecticut disputed the boundaries, leading to Conservator of the Peace being appointed in 1665. In 1703, a Board of Commissioners upheld the Pawcatuck River as the border between Rhode Island and Connecticut. The issue was finally resolved in 1840 when a joint survey was conducted and Connecticut ratified the boundaries.

== Environmental issues ==
The bay has a large infestation of Cladophora algae, which gives off a sulfurous odor in certain conditions. The algae is also ruinous to native sea plants and therefore to the fish and shellfish such as the native quahog.

== Sport ==
The bay is a renowned spot for sea kayaking.

Shellfishing has been banned in various parts of the bay since 1991 due to contamination issues and for the entire bay in 2016 and 2017.
