= Watch Hill, Rhode Island =

Census-designated place in Rhode Island, United States

Watch Hill
- Coastal Neighborhood
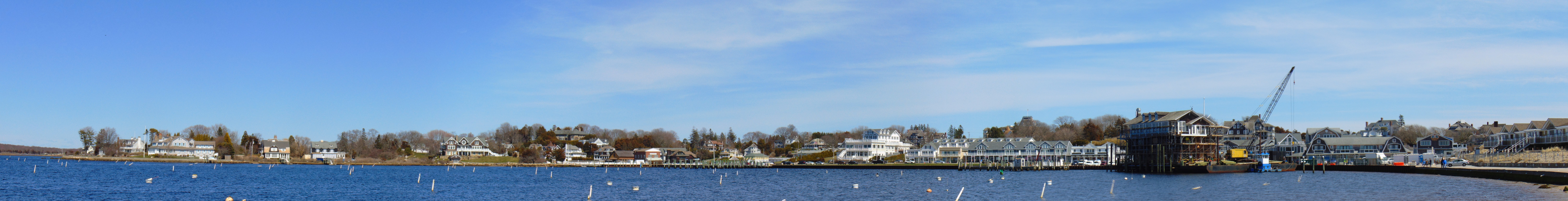
- Panorama of Watch Hill
- Interactive map of Watch Hill
- Coordinates: 41°18′49″N 71°50′59″W
- Country: United States
- State: Rhode Island
- Town: Westerly

Area
  - Total: 0.82 sq mi (2.1 km^{2})
  - Water: 0.014 sq mi (0.036 km^{2})

Population (2020)
  - Total: 212
- Postal code: 02891

Watch Hill is an affluent coastal neighborhood and census-designated place in the town of Westerly, Rhode Island. As of the 2020 census, Watch Hill had a population of 212. It sits at the most-southwestern point in Rhode Island. It came to prominence in the late 19th and early 20th century as an exclusive summer resort, with wealthy families building sprawling Victorian-style "cottages" along the peninsula. Watch Hill is characterized by The New York Times as a community "with a strong sense of privacy and of discreetly used wealth," in contrast with "the overpowering castles of the very rich" in nearby Newport.

== History ==
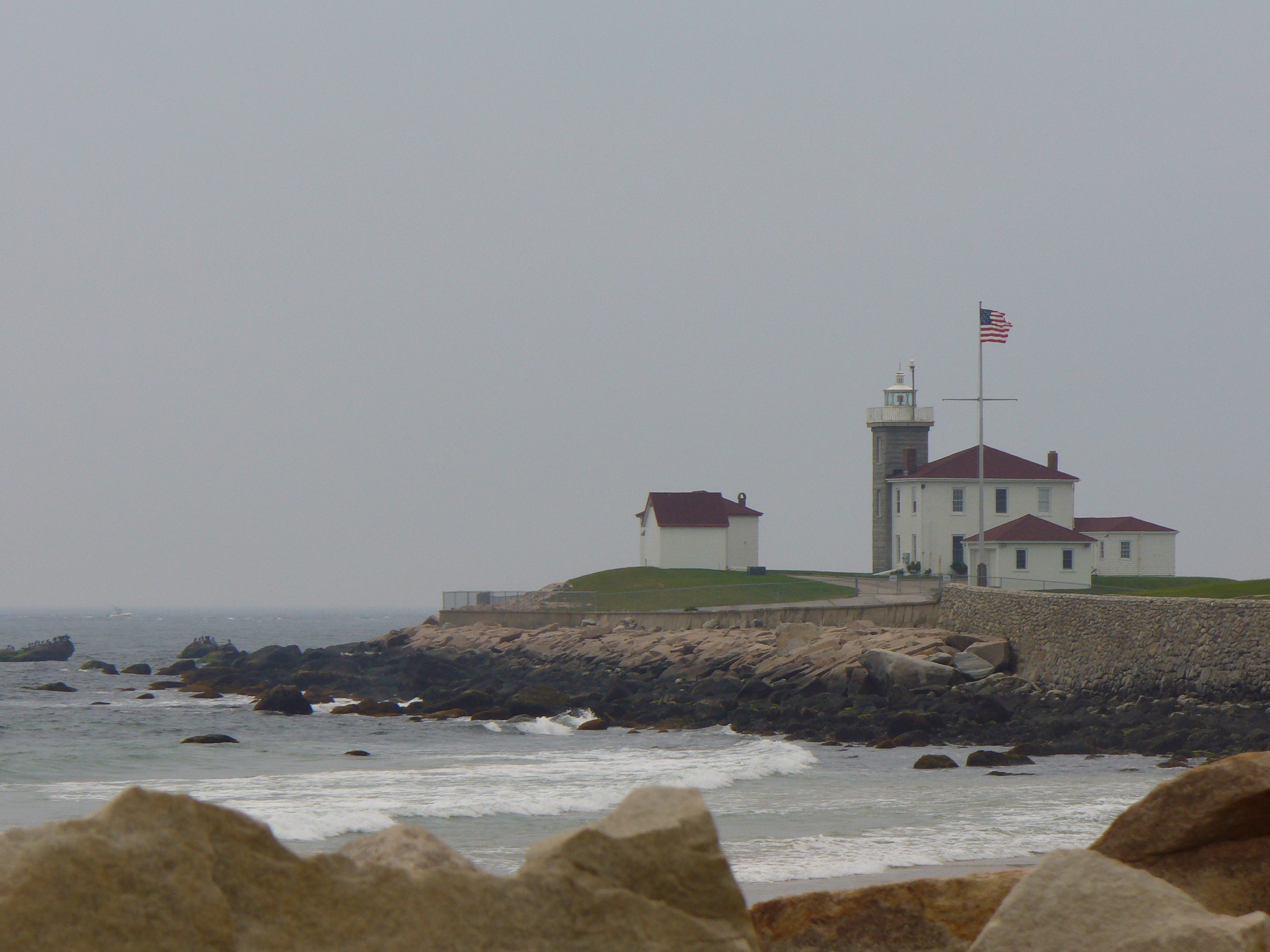
Watch Hill Lighthouse

The Watch Hill area was occupied by Niantic Indians in the 17th century, led by Harman Garrett. Colonists used the hill as an important lookout point during the French and Indian War and the Revolutionary War, hence the community's name. Some landmarks in the village include the Watch Hill Lighthouse, the first of which was built in 1745; The Flying Horse Carousel, the oldest operating suspended-horse carousel in the United States and a National Historic Landmark; the Ocean House hotel; and the 1916 Olympia Tea Room.

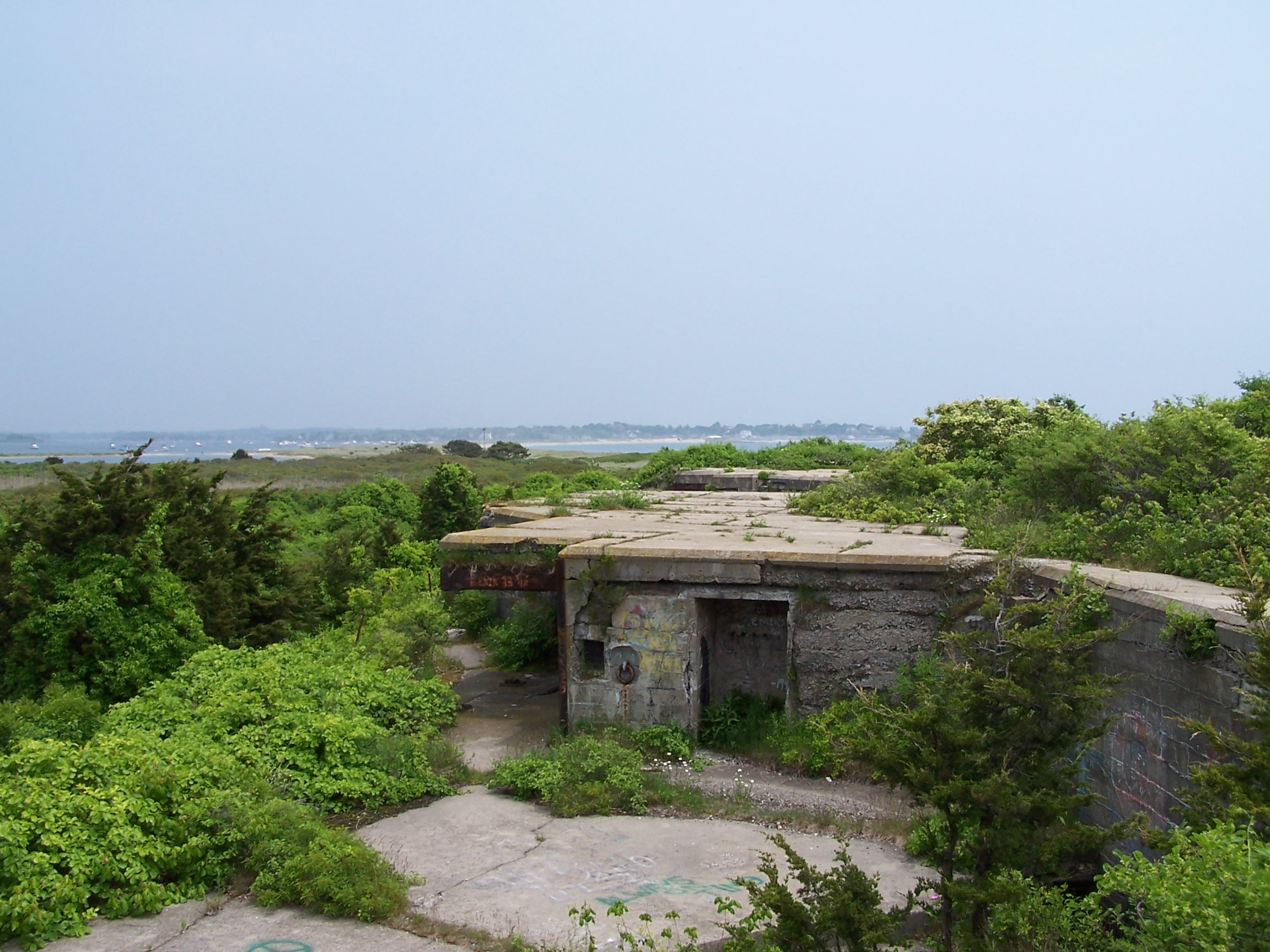
The remains of Fort Mansfield on Napatree Point

One point of interest in Watch Hill is the ruins of Fort Mansfield, an old coastal artillery post situated at the end of Napatree Point. It was one of a series of such forts constructed to guard the eastern entrance to Long Island Sound as part of the coastal defense network for New York City during the Spanish–American War. It was in operation between 1901 and 1909, then was closed down over the course of several years. The land was sold in 1926, and all the government buildings were demolished during the winter of 1928–29. The three concrete gun emplacements were left behind and remain there today.

Fort Road connected Watch Hill to Fort Mansfield, but the hurricane of 1938 wiped it out and destroyed 39 houses, the Yacht and Beach Clubs, and a bathing pavilion. Fifteen people were killed and others survived by clinging to wreckage, as they were swept across the bay to Connecticut. Several breachways were created in Napatree Point after the hurricane passed. Sandy Point remains an island, rather than the northern extension of Napatree. The shortened Napatree Point is now a barrier beach without any roads or houses. It is open to the public, and offers bird watching and surf casting.

== Geography ==
Watch Hill sits at the most southwestern point of Rhode Island on a stubby peninsula jutting into Block Island Sound. It includes a smaller peninsula known as Napatree Point, a 1.5-mile (2.4 km)-long sandy spit that extends west from the Watch Hill business district, and Sandy Point, which was once attached to Napatree Point. Both Napatree and Sandy Point shelter Little Narragansett Bay and have made Watch Hill a popular harbor around which the business district has grown.

Watch Hill is a two-hour drive from Boston and a three-hour drive from New York City. On clear days, there are views of Montauk, New York to the south and Block Island, Rhode Island to the southeast.

According to the United States Census Bureau, the CDP has a total area of 0.82 square miles (2.11 km^{2}), of which 0.80 square miles (2.08 km^{2}) is land and 0.014 square miles (0.036 km^{2}) (1.72%) is water. The Watch Hill Historic District has area of 629 acres (0.983 sq mi).

== Demographics ==
=== 2020 census ===
The 2020 United States census counted 212 people, 94 households, and 41 families in Watch Hill. The population density was 264.3 inhabitants per square mile (102.0/km^{2}). There were 394 housing units at an average density of 491.3 per square mile (189.7/km^{2}). The racial makeup was 97.17% (206) white or European American (96.23% non-Hispanic white), 0.0% (0) black or African-American, 0.0% (0) Native American or Alaska Native, 0.0% (0) Asian, 0.0% (0) Pacific Islander or Native Hawaiian, 0.0% (0) from other races, and 2.83% (6) from two or more races. Hispanic or Latino of any race was 1.42% (3) of the population.

Of the 94 households, 10.6% had children under the age of 18; 56.4% were married couples living together; 23.4% had a female householder with no spouse or partner present. Of households, 31.9% consisted of individuals and 21.3% had someone living alone who was 65 years of age or older. The average household size was 1.7 and the average family size was 2.8. The percent of those with a bachelor’s degree or higher was estimated to be 25.5% of the population.

Of the population, 10.4% was under the age of 18, 10.4% from 18 to 24, 13.2% from 25 to 44, 29.2% from 45 to 64, and 36.8% who were 65 years of age or older. The median age was 56.7 years. For every 100 females, the population had 118.6 males. For every 100 females ages 18 and older, there were 123.5 males.

== Culture ==
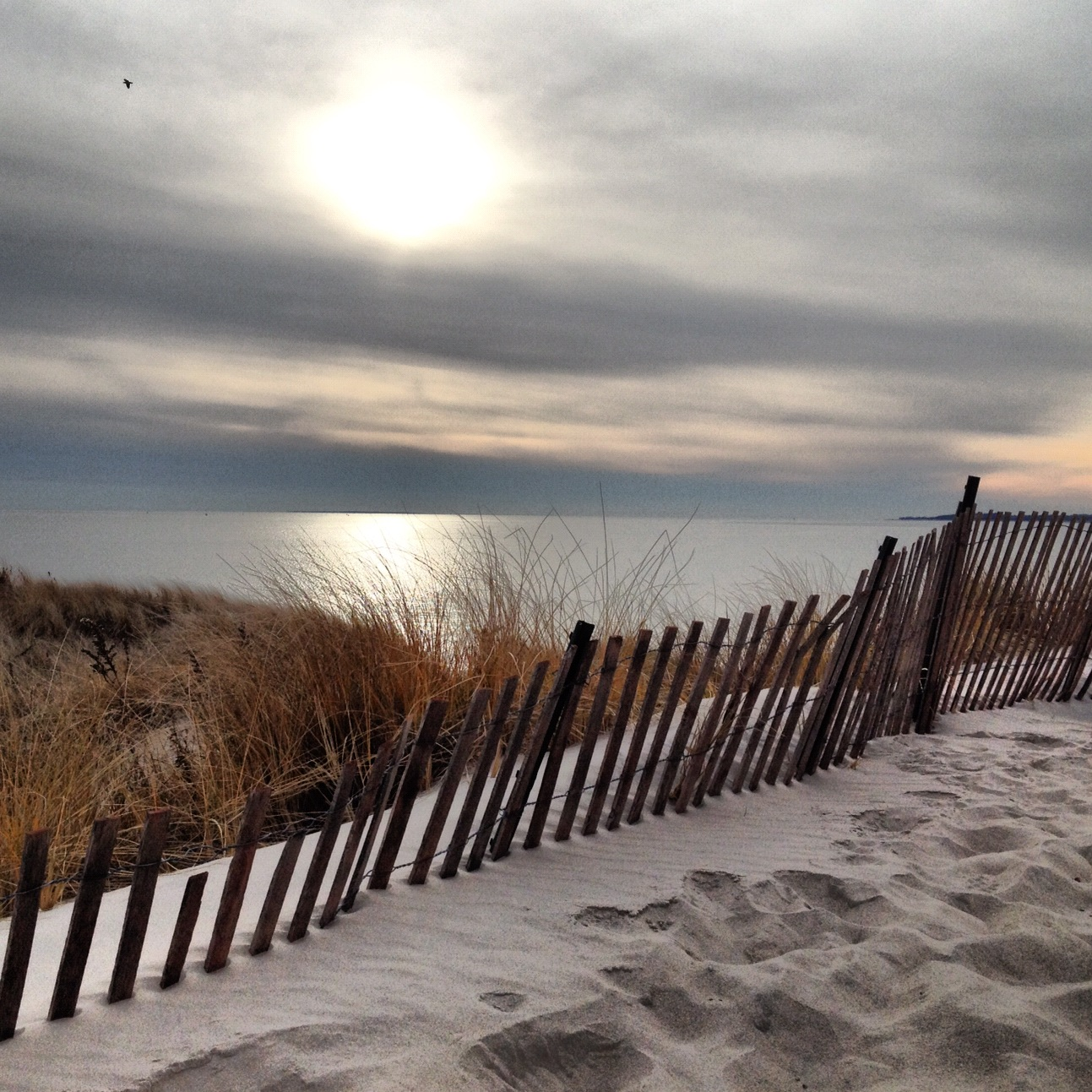
The barrier beach of Napatree Point

According to The New York Times, in the early years, Watch Hill was historically home to "a select group of wealthy families" whose lives revolved around "golf and tennis at the Misquamicut Club, bathing and yachting at the Watch Hill Yacht Club, and tea and cocktails at Ocean House and Watch Hill's other grand hotels." Wealthy families built sprawling Victorian-style "cottages" along the peninsula. The village was known as "a somewhat staid and family-oriented community compared to glittering Newport, Rhode Island's other, more famous summer colony." Famous guests to the seaside resort included Albert Einstein, Douglas Fairbanks, Douglas Fairbanks Jr., Groucho Marx, David Niven and Jean Harlow. Stephen Birmingham described Watch Hill as "an Andorra of Victoriana on the New England shore."

For several generations, the community has maintained its "old-money summer colony" atmosphere, even as traditional summer communities have developed, namely Nantucket, Martha's Vineyard, and the Hamptons. Popular hobbies of its residents, such as golf, sailing, and tennis, as well as the "privacy-loving, multigenerational families tucked into century-old shingled houses", with the majority being passed down in families for several generations. The New York Times notes that "Watch Hill impresses visitors with a strong sense of privacy and of discreetly used wealth—the rambling, old-fashioned, turreted and gingerbreaded Victorian summer houses with piazzas and softly rolling lawns have little in common with the overpowering castles of the very rich in Newport, a place rarely mentioned in Watch Hill even though it is barely 30 miles distant." The waterfront was once lined with huge Victorian hotels. However, fire and hurricanes destroyed almost all during the 20th century. The two remaining hotels are the Ocean House and the Watch Hill Inn; both went through major renovations during the 2000s. The Ocean House was originally opened in 1868; it was torn down in 2005, then completely rebuilt and reopened in 2010.

== Modern Era ==
Today Watch Hill is a well maintained coastal community that features several coastal-themed shops, stores, and restaurants where residents and tourists alike sit in outdoor seating or walk along the main street. The Ocean House today consists of both hotel rooms and condominiums. It is the only Forbes Five-Star and AAA Five Diamond Hotel in Rhode Island and has been described by Celebrities have holidayed at the hotel, including Hugh Jackman and Regis Philbin.

The village is listed as a census-designated place. As a state-charted Fire District (1901), the Watch Hill area is authorized to tax residents to fund their volunteer fire department, but the bulk of property taxes go to the town to fund municipal services and schools. The most expensive private home in Rhode Island, the High Watch, is located in Watch Hill and is owned by Taylor Swift.

== Watch Hill Historic District ==
- Watch Hill Historic District
- U.S. National Register of Historic Places
- U.S. Historic district
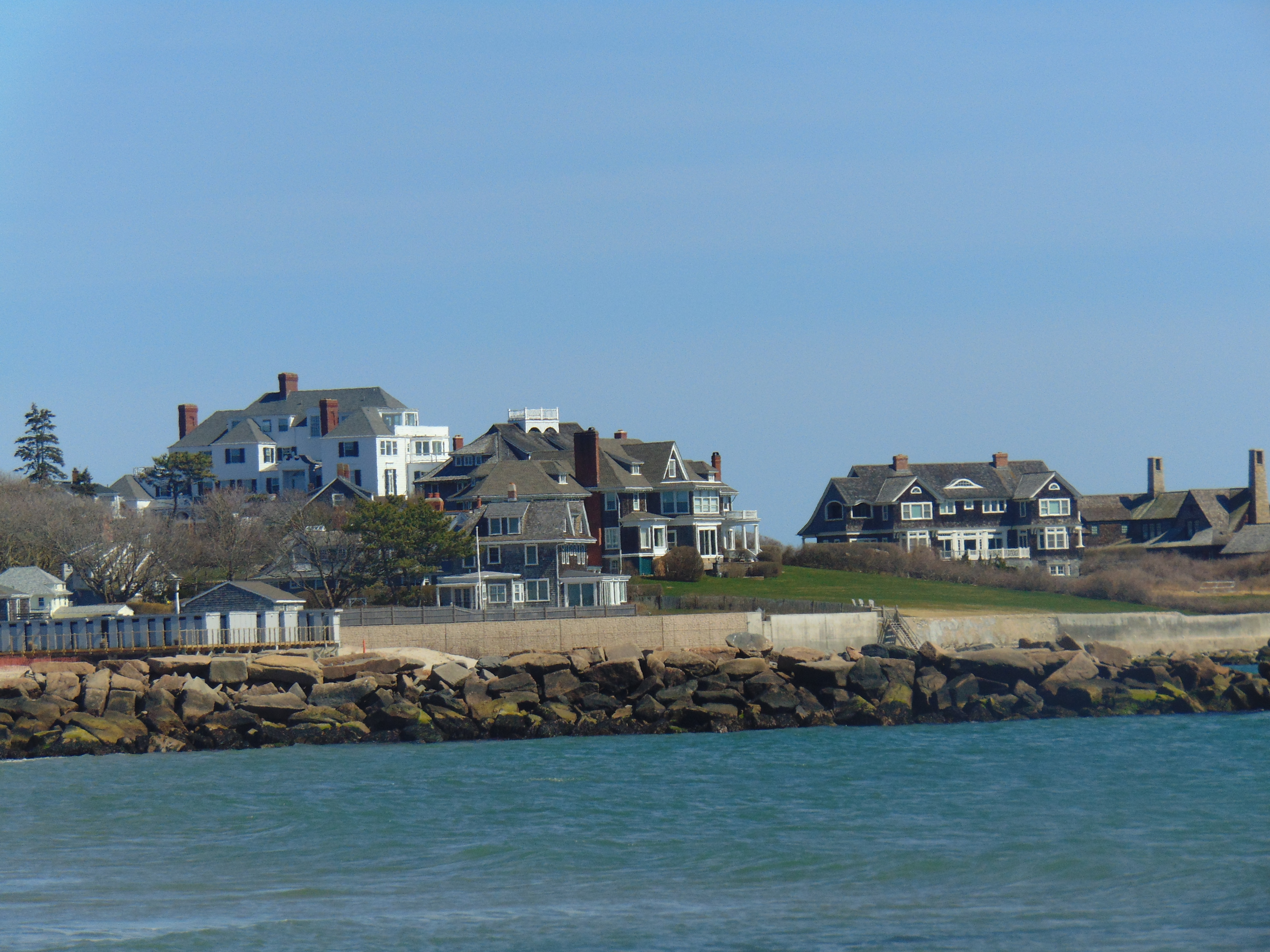
- The High Watch on Watch Hill

- Location within Rhode Island Location within the United States
- Location: Roughly bounded by Breen, Watch Hill & E. Hill Rds., Block Island Sound, Little Narragansett Bay, & Pawtucket River, Westerly, Rhode Island
- Area: 629 acres (2.55 km^{2})
- Architect: Multiple
- Architectural style: Late 19th and 20th Century Revivals, Bungalow/craftsman, Late Victorian
- MPS: Lighthouses of Rhode Island TR (AD)
- NRHP reference No.: 85001948
- Added to NRHP: September 5, 1985

The Watch Hill Historic District was listed on the National Register of Historic Places in 1985. It included 176 contributing buildings and two contributing objects on 629 acres (2.55 km^{2}). The area includes most of the neck which is known as Watch Hill. If the CDP is defined as the entire point beyond (to the west of) a line running north along Browning Rd. and Oak Wood Rd., from East Beach to Colonel Willie Cove, then the historic district can be understood as that area less one portion plus another portion. It excludes a portion west of that line on the north side including properties on Watch Hill Rd. approaching the Watch Hill Fire Department, the entire block within which the Fire Department stands, and all of W. Ridge Rd., Glen Way, Breen Rd., and Pasadena Avenue. It includes a portion to the east of that line, namely the area of the Misquamicut golf club and other property north of Ocean View Highway but not including Round Hill Rd.

Selected contributing buildings are:

- Inglecote (c. 1733), on Westerly Road, originally the Foster family farmhouse, remodelled c. 1880 and c.1890 from a Colonial house to become a "Swiss Chalet";
- the Misquamicut Inn (1778, 1896) on Misquamicut Road, originally the Potter family farmhouse, which was remodelled to become a hotel in 1896 and became the Misquamicut Inn in 1900;
- Highwatch (1931), on Bluff Avenue, also known as Holiday Inn, on the summit of Watch Hill itself;
- Echo Lodge (c. 1886 et seq.), 4 Aquidneck Ave., a Queen Anne house with a three-story octagonal corner tower, a home from 1894 on of hymn-writer William H. Doane.

The two contributing objects are:

- the Ridley Watts Memorial (1940), a drinking fountain with a cast-bronze sculpture titled "The Dreamer" by Sylvia Shaw Judson;
- the Ninigret Statue (1911), a cast-bronze sculpture of Native american chief Ninigret by Enid Yandell, sculptor who was a student of Auguste Rodin, and founder Alexis Rudier, located in a waterfront park designed by Marian Coffin.

== Notable people ==
Notable current and former residents of Watch Hill include:

- Henry Ford (1863–1947), business magnate and founder of Ford Motor Company
- Clark Gable (1901–1960), film actor
- Rebekah Harkness (1915–1982), Standard Oil heiress and founder of the Harkness Ballet; former owner of Swift's residence
- Andrew Mellon (1855–1937), banker, industrialist and Secretary of the Treasury
- Conan O'Brien, television host
- Taylor Swift, singer-songwriter

== See also ==
- National Register of Historic Places listings in Washington County, Rhode Island
