= Watch Hill Light =

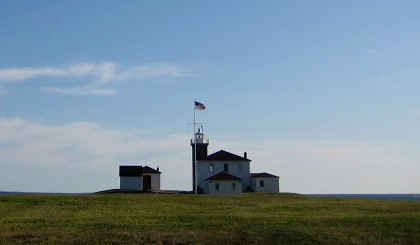
- Location: Watch Hill, Rhode Island
- Coordinates: 41°18′14″N 71°51′30.3″W

Tower
- Constructed: 1808
- Foundation: Granite block
- Construction: Granite with brick interior
- Automated: 1986
- Height: 61 feet (19 m)
- Shape: Square
- Markings: Natural w/ white lantern, red roof
- Fog signal: Horn: 1 every 30s

Light
- First lit: 1857 (current tower)
- Focal height: 61 feet (19 m)
- Lens: 4th order Fresnel lens (original), VRB-25 (current)
- Range: 14 nautical miles (26 km; 16 mi)
- Characteristic: Alternating R&W, 5s

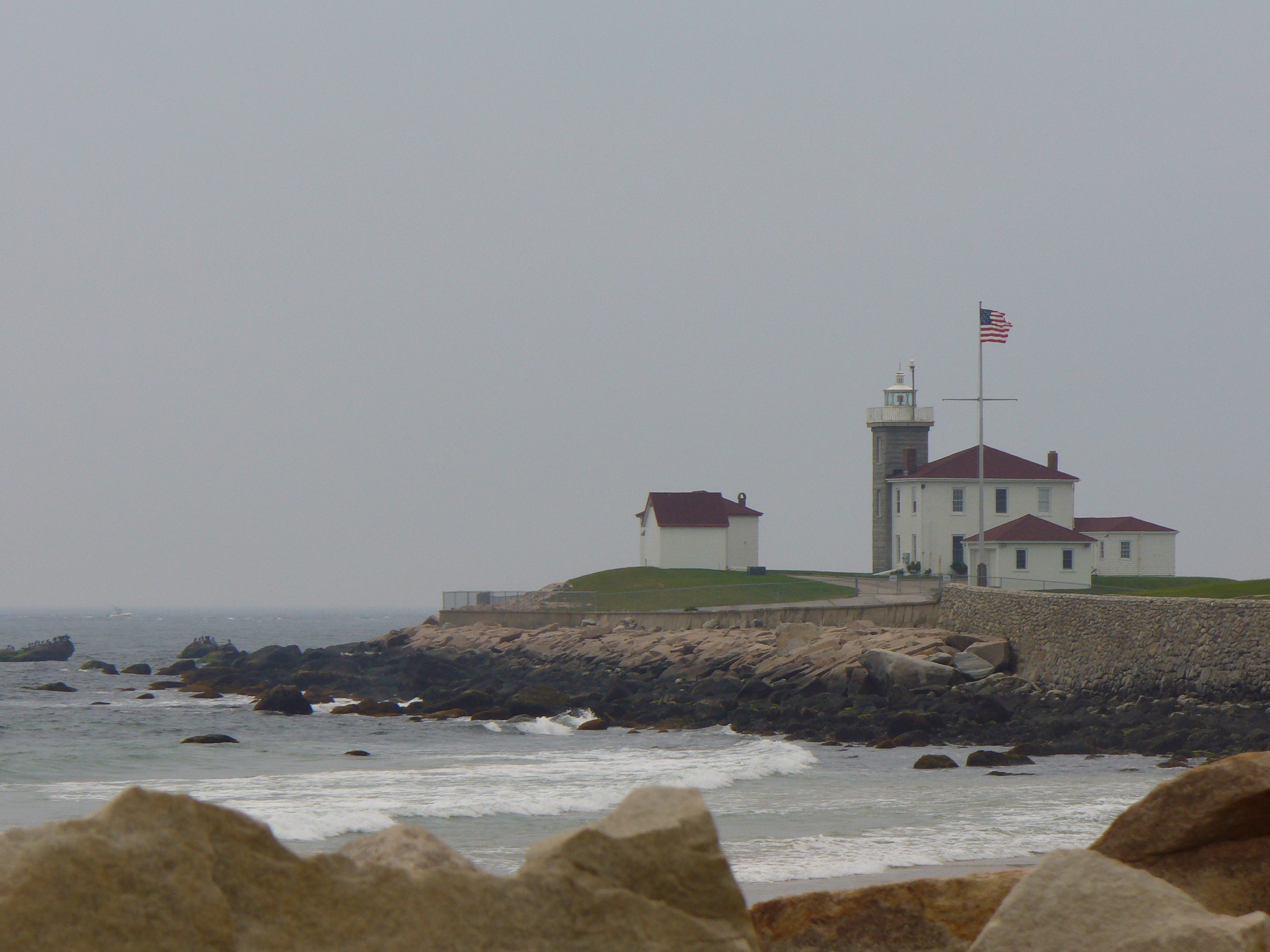

The Watch Hill Lighthouse in Watch Hill, Rhode Island has served as a nautical beacon for ships since 1745, when the Rhode Island colonial government constructed a watchtower and beacon during the French and Indian War and Revolutionary War. The original structure was destroyed in a 1781 storm, and plans were discussed to build a new lighthouse to mark the eastern entrance to Fishers Island Sound and to warn mariners of a dangerous reef southwest of Watch Hill.

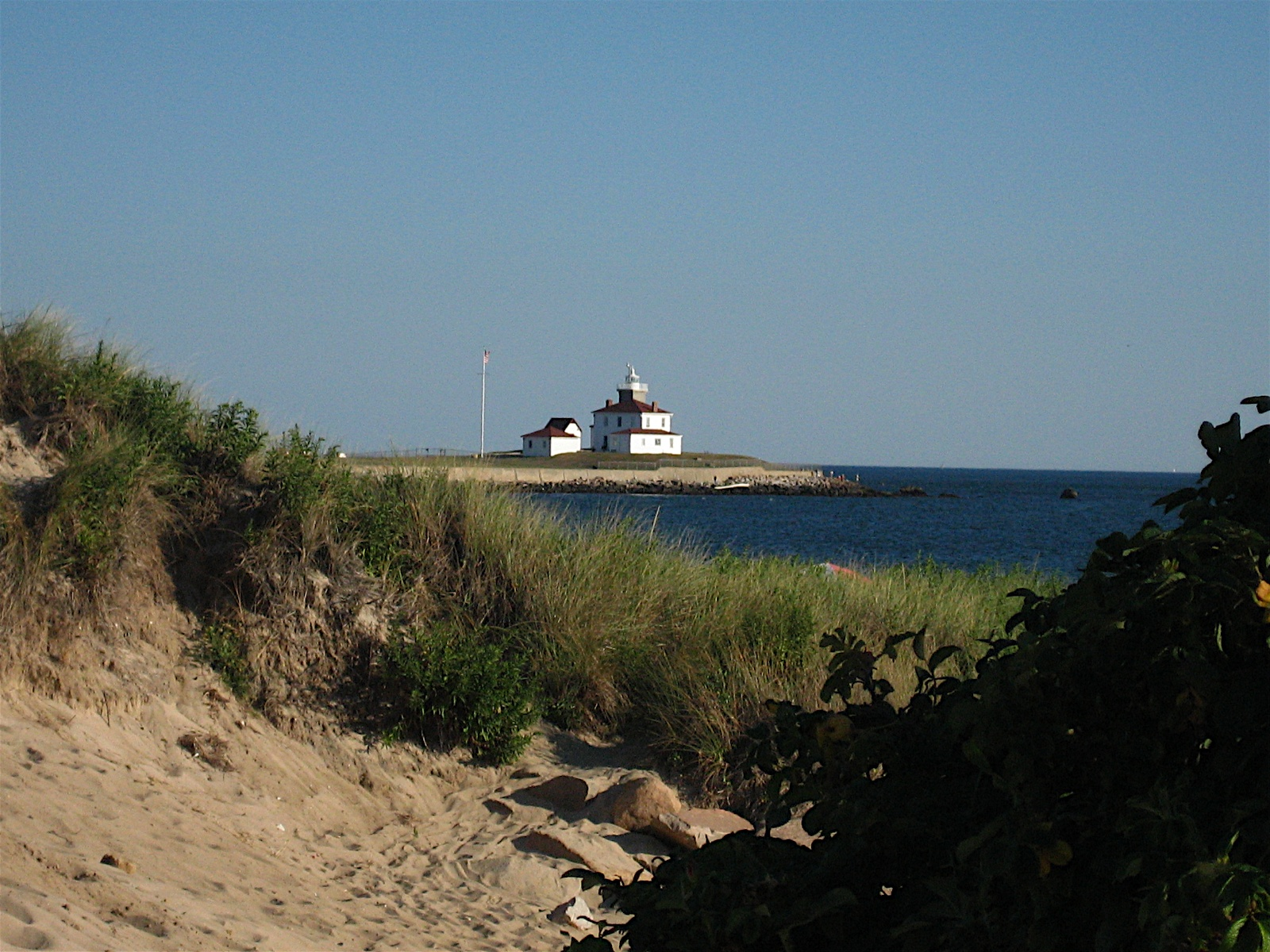

President Thomas Jefferson signed an act to build the lighthouse in 1806, and construction was completed in 1807. The first lighthouse stood 35 feet (11 m) tall.

In 1827, a rotating light was installed to differentiate it from the Stonington Harbor Light in Connecticut. Erosion forced it to close in 1855 and move further away from the bluff edge. The next lighthouse opened in 1856 and remains as the present structure, standing 45 feet (14 m) tall.

The steamer Metis crashed off Watch Hill in 1872, killing 130 people. In 1873, lighthouse keeper Captain Jared Starr Crandall was awarded the Congressional Gold Medal for rescue operations involving the Metis. In 1879, Capt. Crandall's widow Sally Ann (Gavitt) Crandall became the first woman lighthouse keeper there. A United States Life-Saving Service station was built next to it where it operated until the 1940s, but it was destroyed in 1963.

In 1907, the steamer Larchmont collided with a schooner, killing 200 people four miles from the lighthouse. The Hurricane of 1938 caused severe damage to the structure. The Leif Viking ran aground a few hundred feet from it in 1962; there were no injuries, although the ship was stranded for nine days. The light was automated in 1986 and leased to the Watch Hill Lightkeepers Association.

== See also ==
- List of Congressional Gold Medal recipients
