= Fish and Wildlife Coordination Act =

American act for protection of fish and wildlife

The Fish and Wildlife Coordination Act (FWCA) of the United States was enacted March 10, 1934, to protect fish and wildlife when federal actions result in the control or modification of a natural stream or body of water. The Act provides the basic authority for the involvement of the United States Fish and Wildlife Service (Service) in evaluating impacts to fish and wildlife from proposed water resource development projects.

== Description of Intent ==
FWCA authorizes the Secretaries of Agriculture and Commerce to provide assistance to Federal and State agencies in order to protect and increase the supply of wildlife and wildlife resources, as well as to study the effects of domestic sewage, trade wastes, and other pollution on wildlife.

The Act's purposes are to recognize the vital contribution of U.S. wildlife resources, and their increasing public interest and significance. FWCA requires that wildlife conservation be given equal consideration to other features of water-resource development programs through planning, development, maintenance and coordination of wildlife conservation and rehabilitation. Wildlife and wildlife resources are defined by the Act to include: birds, fish, mammals and all other classes of wild animals and all types of aquatic and land vegetation upon which wildlife is dependent.

The Secretary of the Interior (Secretary) is authorized to provide assistance to, and cooperate with, federal, state, and public or private agencies and organizations in:

• developing, protecting, rearing and stocking all species of wildlife, resources thereof, and their habitat; • controlling losses from disease or other causes; • minimizing damages from overabundant species; • providing public shooting and fishing areas, including easements across public lands; and • carrying out other necessary measures.

Additionally, the Secretary is authorized to make surveys and investigations of the wildlife of the public domain, including lands and waters or interest acquired or controlled by an agency of the U.S., and to accept donations of land and contributions of funds in furtherance of the purposes of this Act. Several provisions incorporate the Secretary's authorities relating to migratory birds and state agency authorities concerning fish and wildlife resources. Coordination generally culminates in a report to the requesting agency detailing the results of habitat surveys and other data collection efforts, including recommendations for the project moving forward. The results and recommendations are included in reports to Congress, authorization requests and other project planning documents.

== Summary of Requirements ==
To ensure fish and wildlife resources receive equal consideration to other features of water resource development projects, the FWCA requires Federal agencies involved with such projects to first consult with the U.S. Fish & Wildlife Service and the respective state fish and wildlife agencies regarding the potential impacts of the project on fish and wildlife resources. The results of the consultation are not binding, but the Federal agency must strongly consider input received during consultation to prevent loss or damage to wildlife resources and provide for any measures taken to mitigate such impacts.

Whenever the waters or channel of a body of water are modified by a Federal agency, or by any other entity where a Federal permit is required, adequate consideration must be made for the conservation, maintenance and management of wildlife resources and habitat. The use of the waters, land or interests for wildlife conservation must be in accordance with plans approved jointly by: the head of the department or agency exercising primary administration; the Secretary; the head of the state agency exercising administration of the wildlife resources.

The Secretary, through the Fish and Wildlife Service and the U. S. Bureau of Mines, is further authorized to make investigations to determine the effects of domestic sewage, mine, petroleum, and industrial wastes, erosion silt, and other polluting substances on wildlife, and to make reports and recommendations to Congress.

As a collaborative effort, Federal agencies, the Service and state fish and wildlife agencies must develop measures to protect, develop, and improve wildlife and their habitat. Reports or decision-making documents subsequently prepared by the requesting Federal agency must include the recommendations of the Service and the affected state(s) for protecting fish and wildlife. Where possible, the agency must incorporate these recommendations in the project plans. The constructing, licensing, or permitting federal agency is to include in the project plans such justifiable means and measures as it finds should be adopted to obtain maximum overall project benefits.

In order to comply with the requirements laid out in the Act, Federal agencies must first determine whether a proposed activity will result in the control or modification of a body of water. Typical actions that would fall under the jurisdiction of the Act include:

• discharges of pollutants, including industrial, mining, and municipal wastes or dredged and fill material into a body of water or wetlands; and • projects involving construction of dams, levees, impoundments, stream relocation, and water-diversion structures.

== Penalties ==
Violation of a rule or regulation promulgated in accordance with FWCA is a misdemeanor punishable by a fine, imprisonment for up to one year, or both. (The Sentencing Reform Act of 1984, as amended in 1987, increases allowable fines from the $500 stated in this Act to $100,000 for individuals and $200,000 for organizations. See the summary of the Sentencing Reform Act.)

== Amendments ==
FWCA was amended in 1946 to require consultation with the Service and the fish and wildlife agencies of States where any body of water is controlled or modified by any Federal agency, in order to prevent loss and damage of wildlife resources. The amendments specifically exempted the Tennessee Valley Authority from its provisions.

The 1958 amendments added provisions to require equal consideration and coordination of wildlife conservation with other water resources development programs and authorized the Secretary of Interior to provide public fishing areas and accept donations of lands and funds. These amendments also modified the Watershed Protection and Flood Prevention Act.

== Impacts ==
The FWCA is one of the oldest federal environmental review statutes; it has had a substantial impact on the planning and development of certain types of federal projects, particularly U.S. Army Corps of Engineers dam projects and other major federal construction activities directly affecting navigable waters. The effect of the Act on other types of federal activities has varied significantly. As of the late 1970s, this was due to a number of factors including: 1) lack of resources in the Fish and Wildlife Service, 2) legal questions on the applicability of the Act to certain types of federal activities, 3) recalcitrance on the part of certain federal agencies to comply with the law, and 4) the passage of the National Environmental Policy Act which had, in part, overshadowed FWCA.
