= Partners for Fish and Wildlife =

Partners for Fish and Wildlife is a voluntary partnership program administered by the Fish and Wildlife Service to provide financial and technical assistance to private landowners who wish to protect or restore wetlands, uplands, and riparian and instream habitats. Through 2002, the program entered into nearly 29,000 land owner agreements to protect or restore about 640,000 acres (2,600 km^{2}) of wetlands and almost 1,100,000 acres (4,500 km^{2}) of uplands. This program has been widely used by rural landowners, including farmers.
