= United States Fish and Wildlife Service =

United States federal government agency

- Seal of the U.S. Fish & Wildlife Service

- Flag of the U.S. Fish & Wildlife Service

Agency overview
- Formed: Fish and Wildlife Service: June 30, 1940; 86 years ago U.S. Fish and Wildlife Service: 1956; 70 years ago
- Preceding agency: Bureau of Fisheries
- Jurisdiction: Federal government
- Headquarters: Bailey's Crossroads, Virginia; 38°50′46″N 77°7′12″W
- Employees: ~ 8,000
- Annual budget: $1.58 billion (2021)
- Agency executives: Brian Nesvik, Director; Tyler Kellogg, Principal Deputy Director
- Parent department: United States Department of the Interior
- Website: fws.gov

The United States Fish and Wildlife Service (USFWS or FWS) is a U.S. federal government agency within the United States Department of the Interior which oversees the management of fish, wildlife, and natural habitats in the United States. The mission of the agency is: "working with others to conserve, protect, and enhance fish, wildlife, plants and their habitats for the continuing benefit of the American people".

== History ==
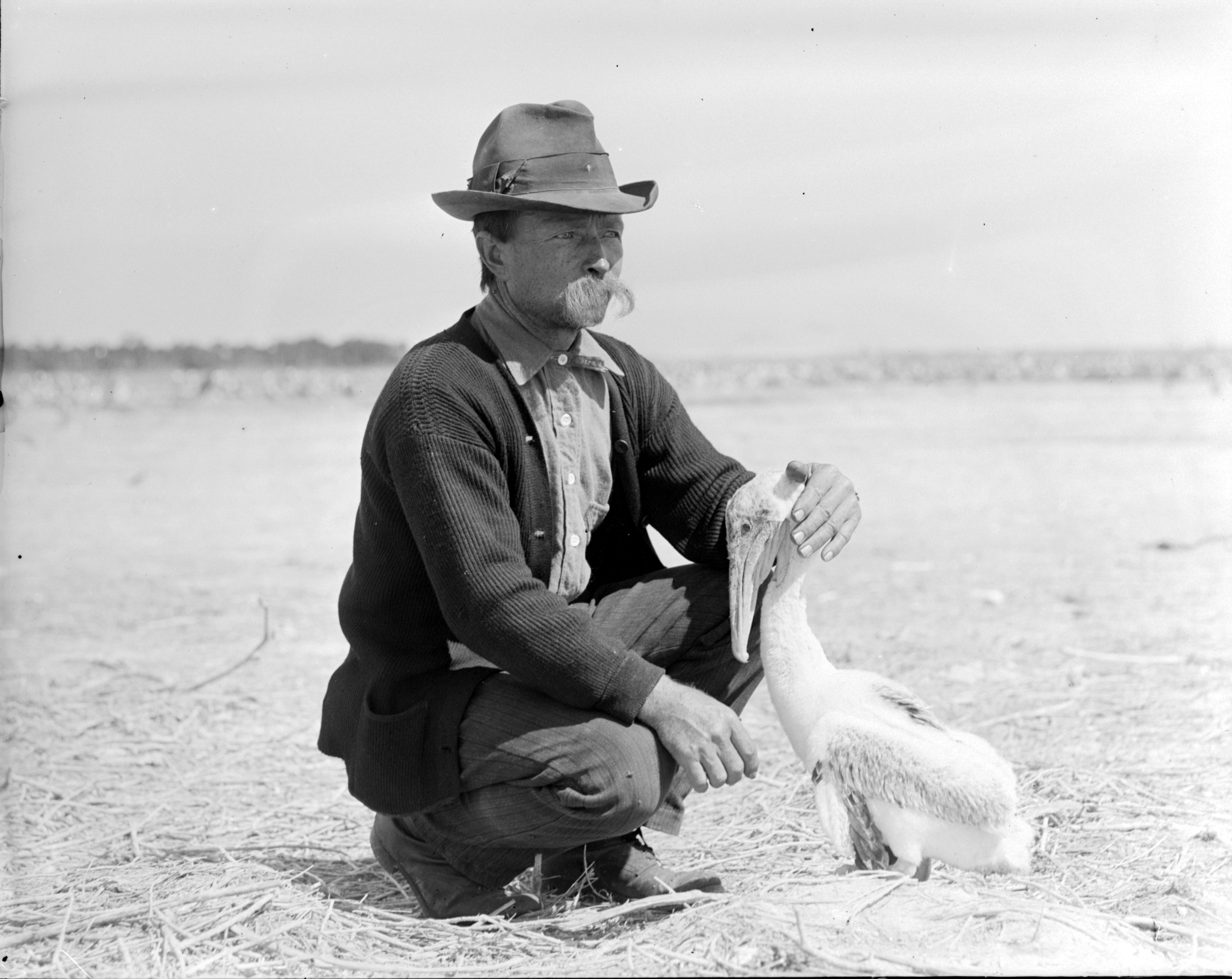
Game warden Paul Kroegel with a brown pelican at Pelican Island, 1907

=== Fish Commission and Bureau of Fisheries ===
The original ancestor of the agency was the United States Commission on Fish and Fisheries, more commonly referred to as the United States Fish Commission, created in 1871 by the United States Congress with the purpose of studying and recommending solutions to a noted decline in the stocks of food fish. Spencer Fullerton Baird was appointed to lead it as the first United States Commissioner of Fisheries. In 1903, the Fish Commission was reorganized as the United States Bureau of Fisheries and made part of the United States Department of Commerce and Labor.

When the Department of Commerce and Labor was split into the United States Department of Commerce and the United States Department of Labor in 1913, the Bureau of Fisheries was made part of the Department of Commerce. Originally focused on fisheries science and fish culture, the Bureau of Fisheries also assumed other duties; in 1906, the U.S. Congress assigned it the responsibility for the enforcement of fishery and fur seal-hunting regulations in the District of Alaska, and in 1910 for the management and harvest of northern fur seals, foxes, and other fur-bearing animals in the Pribilof Islands, as well as for the care, education, and welfare of the Aleut communities in the islands. In 1939, the Bureau of Fisheries moved from the Department of Commerce to the Department of the Interior.

=== Bureau of Biological Survey ===
The other ancestor of the agency began as the Section of Economic Ornithology, which was established within the United States Department of Agriculture in 1885 and became the Division of Economic Ornithology and Mammalogy in 1886. In 1896 it became the Division of Biological Survey. Clinton Hart Merriam headed the Division for 25 years and became a national figure for improving the scientific understanding of birds and mammals in the United States.

By 1905 with funding scarce, the Survey included in its mission the eradication of wolves, coyotes and other large predators. This garnered them the support of ranchers and western legislators resulting, by 1914, in a $125,000 congressionally approved budget for destroying wolves, coyotes and other animals injurious to agriculture and animal husbandry. Meanwhile, scientists like Joseph Grinnell and Charles C. Adams, a founder of the Ecological Society of America, were promoting a balance of nature. In 1924, at a conference organized by the American Society of Mammalogists, the debate generated a public split between those in the Survey, promoting eradication, and the mammalogists who promoted some sort of accommodation. The Survey subsequently placed over 2 million poisoned bait stations across the west. The Survey then turned to the eradication of coyote, coordinated through the 1931 Animal Damage Control Act.

In 1934, the Division of Biological Survey was reorganized as the Bureau of Biological Survey and Jay Norwood Darling was appointed its chief;. The same year, Congress passed the Fish and Wildlife Coordination Act, one of the oldest federal environmental review statutes. Under Darling's guidance, the Bureau began an ongoing legacy of protecting vital natural habitat throughout the United States. In 1939, the Bureau of Biological Survey moved from the Department of Agriculture to the Department of the Interior.

=== Fish and Wildlife Service ===
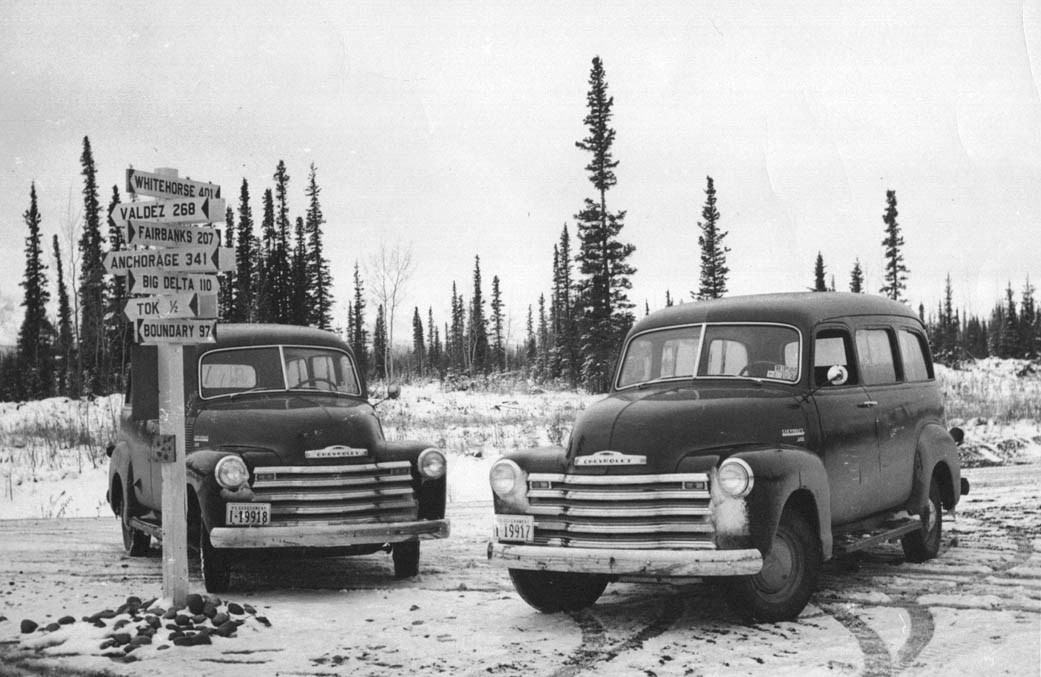
Patrol vehicles of the Fish & Wildlife Service in Alaska, 1950.

On June 30, 1940, the Bureau of Fisheries and the Bureau of Biological Survey were combined to form the Department of the Interior's Fish and Wildlife Service. In 1956, the Fish and Wildlife Service was reorganized as the United States Fish and Wildlife Service — which remained part of the Department of the Interior — and divided its operations into two bureaus, the Bureau of Sport Fisheries and Wildlife and the Bureau of Commercial Fisheries, with the latter inheriting the history and heritage of the old U.S. Fish Commission and U.S. Bureau of Fisheries.

In 1970, the National Oceanic and Atmospheric Administration was formed within the Department of Commerce. That year, the Bureau of Commercial Fisheries merged with the saline water laboratories of the Bureau of Sport Fisheries and Wildlife. This led to the creation of today's National Marine Fisheries Service, which also acquired the former fleet of the United States Fish and Wildlife Service.

The use of poisoned bait stations continued into the early 1970s. Although it resulted in the deaths of hundreds of thousands of coyotes, this method failed to significantly reduce their population. Instead, due to their remarkable adaptability and resilience, coyotes migrated into a wider range of habitats, even venturing into urban areas. Driven by growing environmental awareness in the late 1960s and early 1970s, Richard Nixon banned poisons used since the Second World War and signed the Endangered Species Act of 1973. In 1985 Ronald Reagan reversed the poison killing ban and transferred the responsibility for predator control to the Wildlife Services program under the Department of Agriculture.

== Habitat conservation ==
The agency plays a vital role in wildlife and habitat conservation through various key functions, including protecting native species, managing migratory bird populations, restoring fisheries to support ecosystems, conserving vital habitats like wetlands, and overseeing wildlife efforts on military bases per the Sikes Act.

=== National Wildlife Refuge System ===
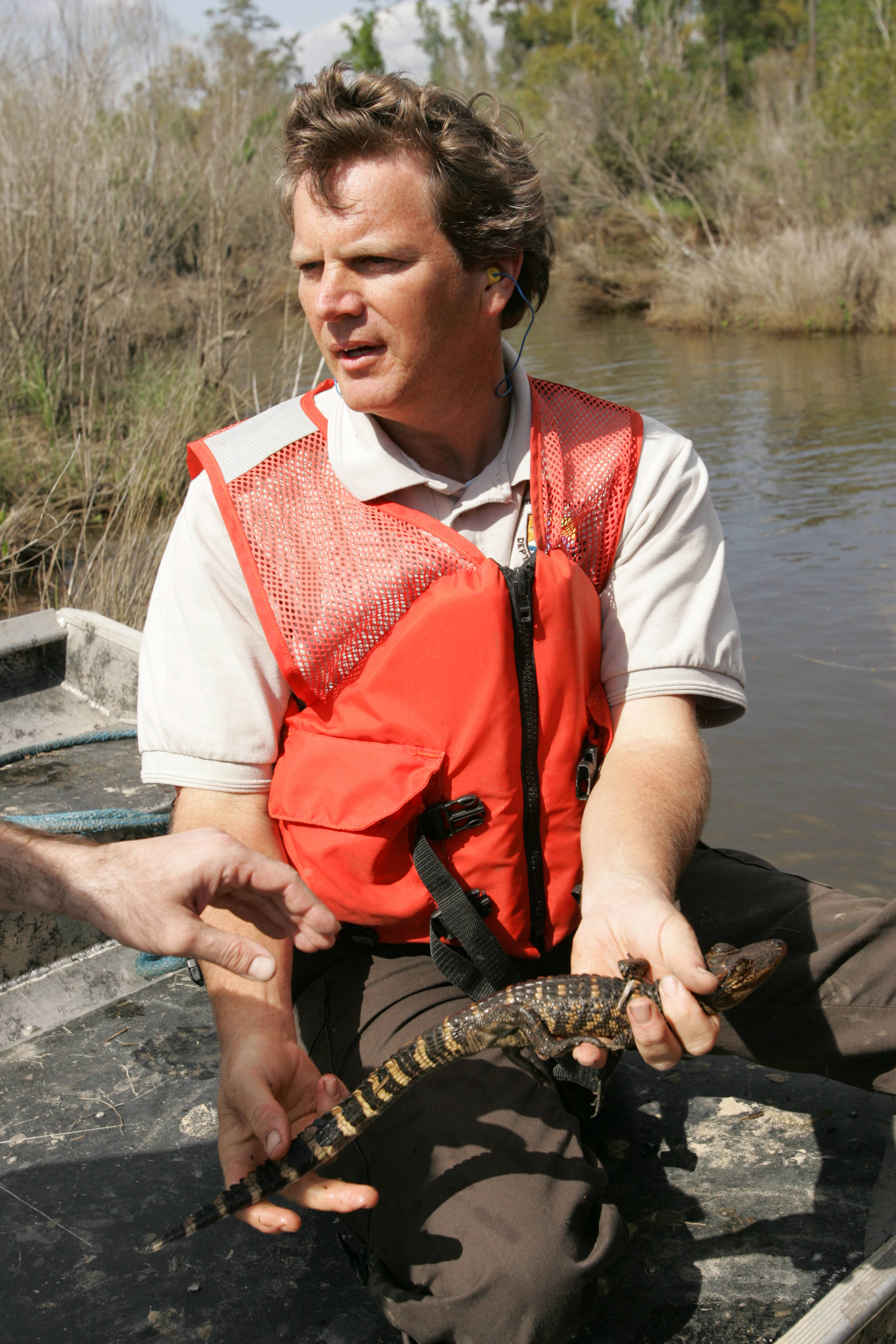
Biologist examining a baby alligator in the Big Branch Marsh National Wildlife Refuge

The agency manages the National Wildlife Refuge System, guided by the National Wildlife Refuge System Administration Act of 1966, which consists of 570 National Wildlife Refuges, encompassing a full range of habitat types, including wetlands, prairies, coastal and marine areas, and temperate, tundra, and boreal forests spread across all 50 U.S. states. It also manages thousands of small wetlands and other areas covering over 150 million acres.

=== National Monuments ===
The agency participates in the governance of six National Monuments:

- The Hanford Reach National Monument in Washington state;
- The Papahānaumokuākea Marine National Monument, a huge maritime area in the Northwestern Hawaiian Islands;
- The Aleutian Islands World War II National Monument in the Aleutian Islands in Alaska;
- The Pacific Islands Heritage Marine National Monument, the largest marine protected area in the world;
- The Rose Atoll Marine National Monument in American Samoa;
- The Marianas Trench Marine National Monument, which includes undersea mud volcanoes, vents, chemosynthetic organisms, and many of the deepest points on Earth.

=== Endangered species ===
The agency shares responsibility for administering the Endangered Species Act of 1973 with the National Marine Fisheries Service. The latter is responsible for marine species, while the agency oversees freshwater fish and all other species. The two organizations jointly manage species that inhabit both marine and non-marine environments. To manage the listing process, a listing priority number is assigned to candidate species to reflect the relative urgency of listing them as threatened or endangered when an immediate listing is not feasible. The agency publishes the quarterly Endangered Species Bulletin.

=== National Conservation Training Center ===
The National Conservation Training Center trains employees and partners in the accomplishment of the agency's mission. The vast majority of fish and wildlife habitats are on state or private land not controlled by the United States government. Therefore, the agency's Partners for Fish and Wildlife program works closely with private groups such as Partners in Flight, National Wildlife Refuge Association, and the Landscape conservation cooperatives to promote voluntary habitat conservation and restoration.

== Migratory bird program ==
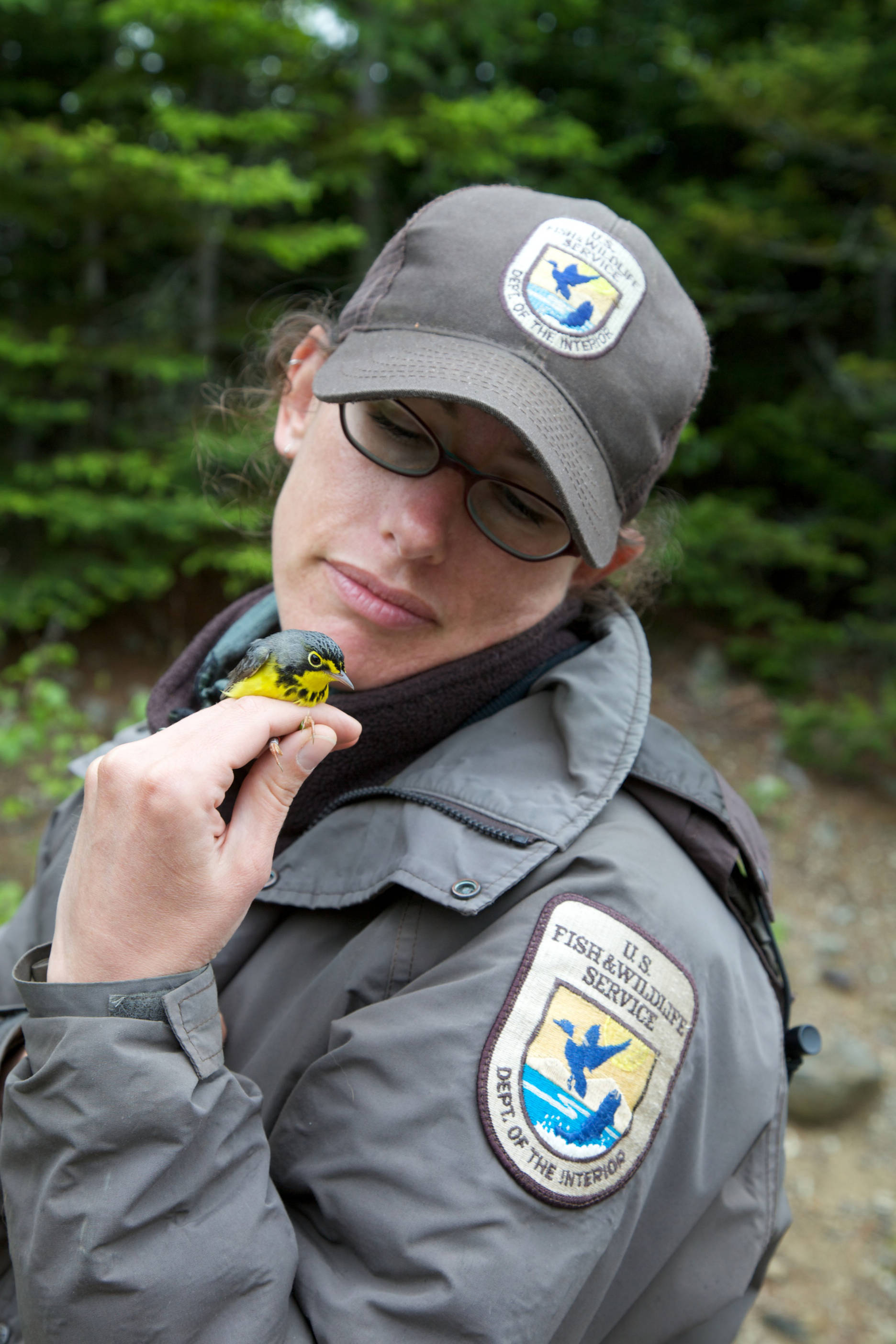
Biologist with a Canada warbler in Silvio O. Conte National Fish and Wildlife Refuge

The Migratory Bird Program aims to protect and conserve bird populations and habitats. It ensures ecological sustainability, enhances opportunities for birdwatching and other outdoor activities, and promotes awareness of the importance of migratory birds. To achieve these goals, the program utilizes resources such as the National Wetlands Inventory to map and monitor critical wetland habitats. The program conducts surveys, coordinates conservation partnerships, offers conservation grants, develops policies, and manages conservation laws, such as the Migratory Bird Conservation Act, educates children, and provides resources for engaging with nature and birds.

=== Federal Duck Stamp ===
The agency organizes the annual art competition for the Federal Duck Stamp, formally known as the Migratory Bird Hunting and Conservation Stamp, a collectable adhesive stamp required for waterfowl hunting. It also allows access to National Wildlife Refuges without paying an admission fee. Since 1934, sales of Federal Duck Stamps have generated over $1.2 billion, which has enabled the conservation of more than 6 million acres of wetlands habitat. This makes the Duck Stamp one of the most successful wetland conservation revenue programs in history, with over 98% of the funds directly supporting the acquisition of wetlands and conservation easements for the National Wildlife Refuge System.

== Restoring fisheries ==
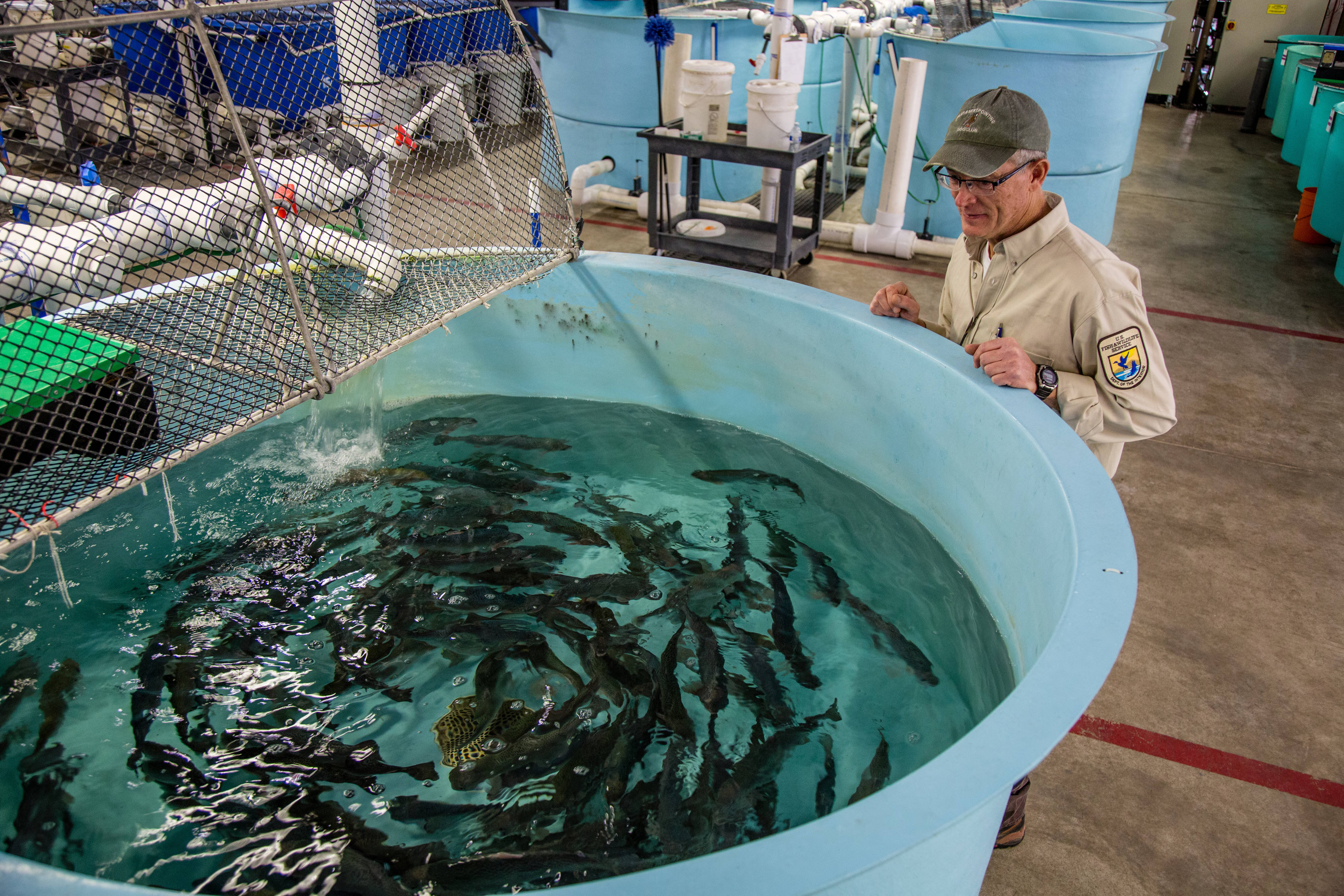
Bozeman National Fish Hatchery

The agency oversees the National Fish Hatchery System which includes 71 fish hatcheries and 65 conservation offices. Originally created to reverse declines in lake and coastal fish stocks, the program subsequently expanded its mission to include the preservation of the genes of wild and hatchery-raised fish. The fish hatcheries contribute to the restoration of native fish populations, freshwater mussels, and amphibians including populations of species listed under the Endangered Species Act, and providing fish to benefit Native Americans and nature reserves.

The National Fish Passage Program provides financial and technical resources to projects that promote the free movement of fish and aquatic life. Common projects include dam removal and fishway construction. Between 1999 and 2023, the program has worked with over 2,000 local partners to open 61,000 mi (98,000 km) of upstream habitat by removing or bypassing 3,400 aquatic barriers. The agency also plays a key role both in protecting sensitive marine coastal ecosystems under the Coastal Barrier Resources Act and in conducting evaluations of the impacts on fish and wildlife resulting from proposed water resources development projects, in accordance with the Fish and Wildlife Coordination Act.

== Law enforcement ==
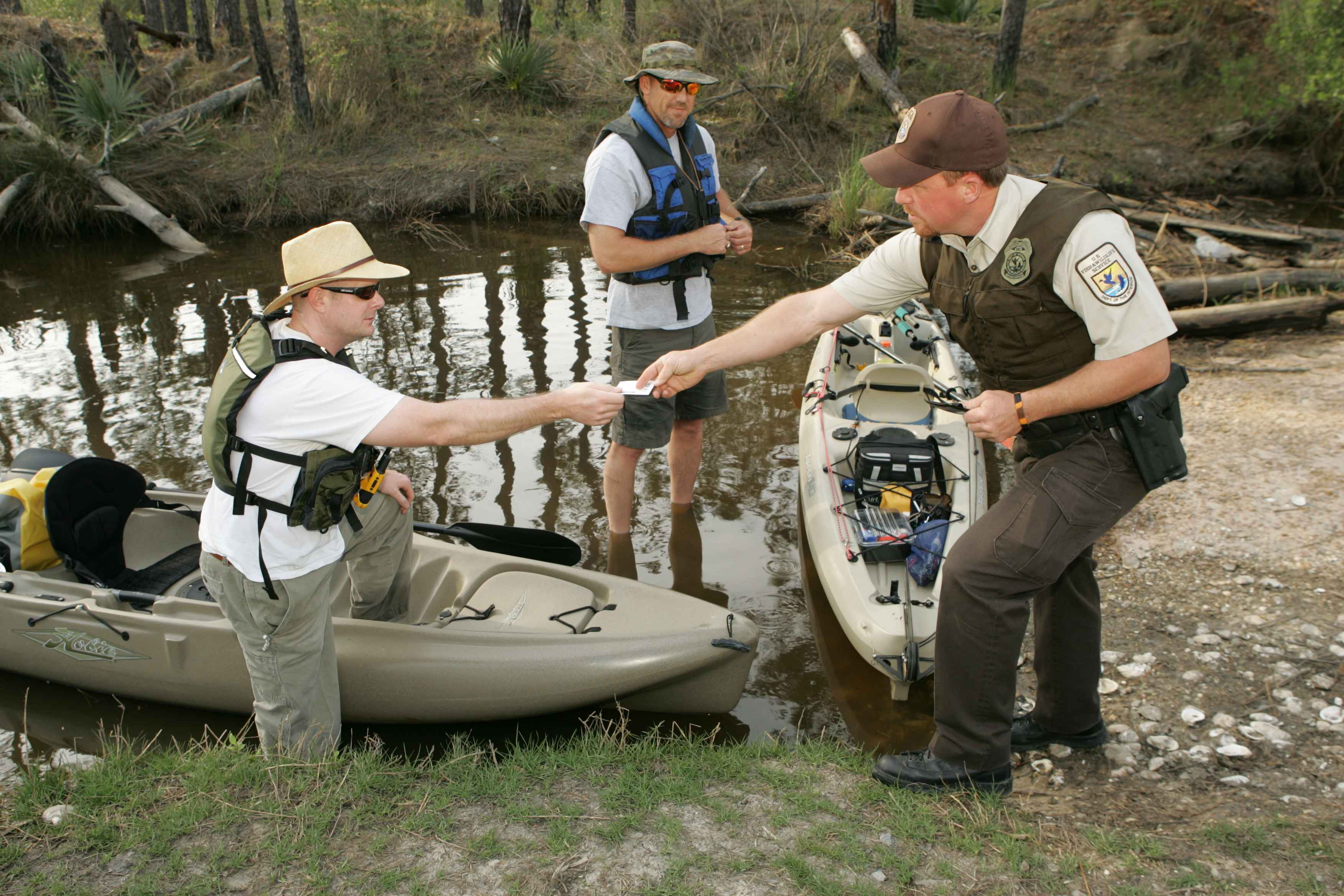
Officer checking a fishing license

The Office of Law Enforcement enforces wildlife laws such as the Marine Mammal Protection Act, the Migratory Bird Treaty Act of 1918, and the Lacey Act of 1900. The Refuge Law Enforcement officers safeguard National Wildlife Refuges, playing a vital role in preventing habitat destruction. The office also provides training to law enforcement officers, and collaborates with tribal partners to conserve wildlife resources.

The International Affairs Program coordinates national and global initiatives to protect, restore, and enhance wildlife and habitats, with a focus on species of international concern. It fulfills obligations under international treaties, such as CITES. The program collaborates with private citizens, local communities, government agencies, conservation organizations, and other stakeholders to implement treaties and laws and conserve species worldwide.

=== Fish and Wildlife Forensic Laboratory ===
The agency operates the Clark R. Bavin National Fish and Wildlife Forensic Laboratory, the only forensics laboratory in the world devoted to wildlife law enforcement. By treaty, it also is the official crime laboratory for CITES and Interpol. The laboratory identifies the species or subspecies of pieces, parts, or products of an animal to determine its cause of death, help wildlife officers determine if a violation of law occurred in its death, and to identify and compare physical evidence to link suspects to the crime scene and the animal's death.

== Tribal relations ==
Pursuant to the Eagle feather law and the Bald and Golden Eagle Protection Act, the agency administers the National Eagle Repository and the permit system for Native American religious use of eagle feathers. These exceptions often only apply to Native Americans that are registered with the federal government and are enrolled with a federally recognized tribe.

In the late 1990s and early 2000s, the agency began to incorporate the research of tribal scientists into conservation decisions. This came on the heels of Native American traditional ecological knowledge gaining acceptance in the scientific community as a reasonable and respectable way to gain knowledge of managing the natural world. Additionally, other natural resource agencies within the United States government, such as the United States Department of Agriculture, have taken steps to be more inclusive of tribes, native people, and tribal rights. This has marked a transition to a relationship of more co-operation rather than the tension between tribes and government agencies seen historically. Today, these agencies work closely with tribal governments to ensure the best conservation decisions are made and that tribes retain their sovereignty.

== In popular culture ==
Tom Lehrer's satirical song, Poisoning Pigeons in the Park, gained notoriety in 1959 for its criticism against the agency's Animal Damage Control program's cruel practice of poisoning pigeons. This program was in 1985 transferred to the Department of Agriculture and renamed Wildlife Services.

In the 2017 contemporary Western crime film Wind River, Jeremy Renner plays a U.S. Fish and Wildlife Service tracker who teams up with an FBI agent to solve a murder in the Wind River Indian Reservation.

Ethan Hawke's character impersonates a Federal Wildlife Officer in the first season of The Lowdown (American TV series).
