= Ford F-Series (third generation) =

Third generation of the Ford F-Series pickup trucks

Third-generation Ford F-Series
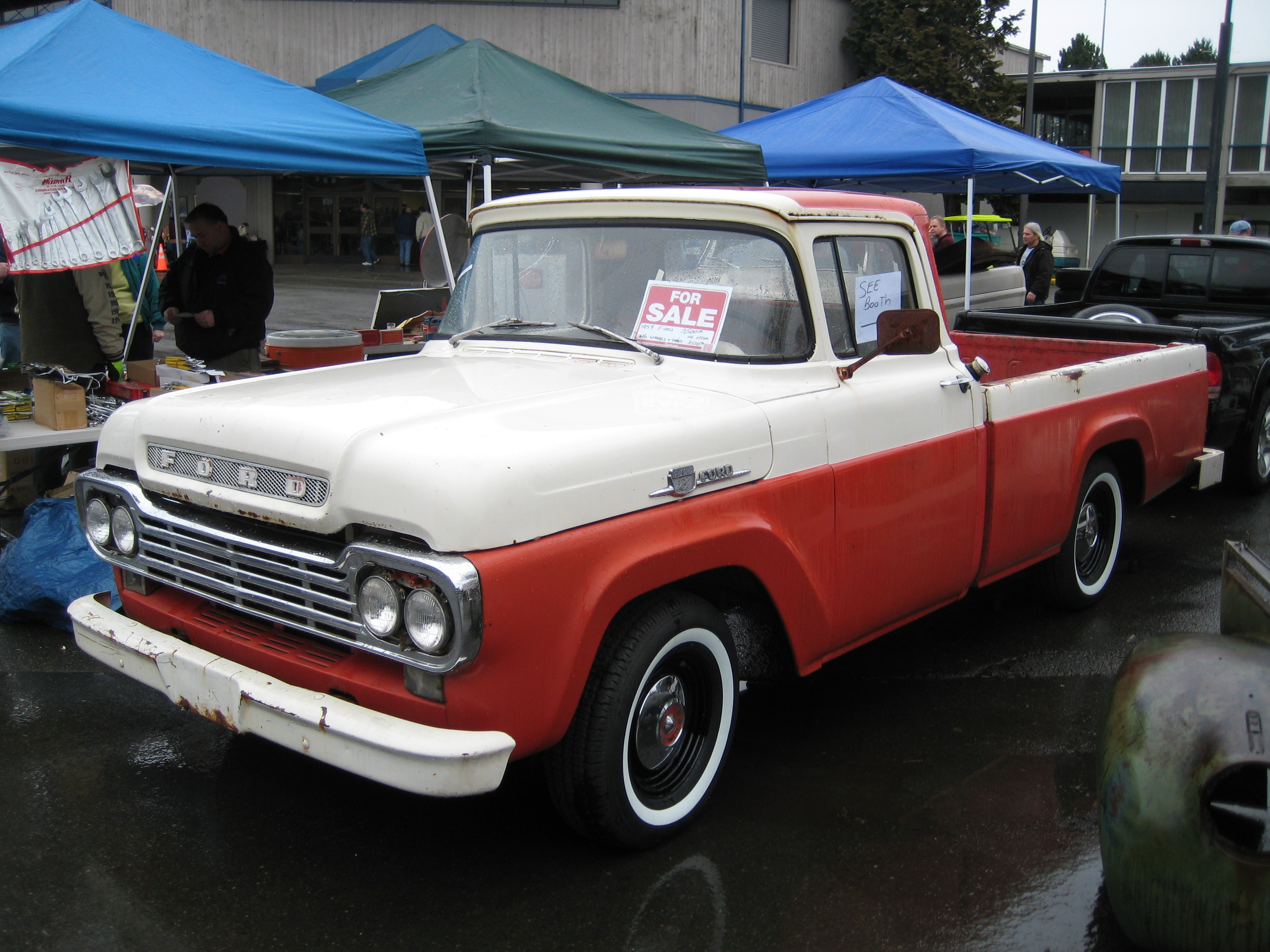
- 1959 Ford F100

Overview
- Manufacturer: Ford
- Also called: Mercury M-Series
- Production: 1957–1960; 1962–1971 (Brazil)
- Assembly: North America: Chester, Pennsylvania (Chester Assembly); Chicago, Illinois (Chicago Assembly); Claycomo, Missouri (Kansas City Assembly); Dearborn, Michigan (Dearborn Assembly Plant); Edison, New Jersey (Edison Assembly); Hapeville, Georgia (Atlanta Assembly); Hazelwood, Missouri (St. Louis Assembly); Highland Park, Michigan (Highland Park Plant; ended 1957); Long Beach, California (Long Beach Assembly; closed 1959); Lorain, Ohio (Lorain Assembly; started 1958); Louisville, Kentucky (Louisville Assembly Plant); heavy-duty models; Milpitas, California) (San Jose Assembly; Norfolk, Virginia (Norfolk Assembly); St. Paul, Minnesota (Twin Cities Assembly); Wayne, Michigan (Michigan Truck Plant); South America: La Boca, Argentina (Ford Argentina); São Paulo, Brazil (Ford Brazil)

Body and chassis
- Class: Full-size pickup truck
- Body style: 2-door pickup; 2-door panel van
- Layout: Front engine, rear-wheel drive / four-wheel drive

Powertrain
- Engine: 223 CID (3.7 L) Mileage Maker I6; 272 CID (4.5 L) Y-block V8; 292 CID (4.8 L) Y-block V8
- Transmission: 3/4-speed manual 3-speed automatic

Dimensions
- Wheelbase: 110 in (2,794 mm) (F-100 6.5' bed); 118 in (2,997 mm) (F-100/250 8' bed); 130 in (3,302 mm) (F-350 9' bed)

Chronology
- Predecessor: Ford F-Series (second generation) (1953–1956)
- Successor: Ford F-Series (fourth generation) (1961–1966); Ford E-Series (panel van)

The third-generation of the Ford F-Series is a series of trucks that were produced by Ford from 1957 until 1960. Following its competitors at Dodge and General Motors, Ford widened the front bodywork to integrate the cab and front fenders together. Going a step further, the F-Series integrated the hood into the bodywork with a clamshell design; the feature would stay part of the F-Series for two decades. Although offered previously, the optional chrome grille was far more prominent than before. In the rear, two types of pickup boxes were offered, starting a new naming convention: the traditional separate-fender box was dubbed "Flareside", while "Styleside" boxes integrated the pickup bed, cab, and front fenders together. As before, Ford still offered a low-GVWR version of each model.

In May 1957, Ford discontinued building trucks at the Highland Park Ford Plant in Highland Park, Michigan. All light and medium trucks were transferred to 10 other plants in the USA. After 1969, heavy-duty trucks (above F-350) and some light duty trucks were transferred to Kentucky Truck Assembly in Louisville, Kentucky. Third generation trucks were built in Brazil as the F-100, F-350, and F-600 from 1962 until 1971, featuring the 272 and 292 cu.in. Y-Block V8.

OHV sixes and V8s were the same ones as used in Ford cars of the era.

This was the last generation of the panel van. Ford would not offer a full-size van again until the 1968 introduction of the second generation E-Series.

== Yearly changes ==
=== 1958 ===
The grille was updated; the dual headlights are replaced by quad headlights (the only generation of the F-Series to use them).

=== 1959 ===
Ford introduced the option of the F-Series in four-wheel drive. Previously a conversion outsourced to Marmon-Herrington, Ford was the first of the "big three" U.S. manufacturers to manufacture four-wheel drive trucks on its own.

Models:

- F-100 (F10, F11, F14): 1/2 ton (4,000–5,000 GVWR max)
- F-100 (F18, F19)(4×4): 1/2 ton (4,000–5,600 GVWR max)
- F-250 (F25, F26): 3/4 ton (4,900–7,400 GVWR max)
- F-250 (F28, F29)(4×4): 3/4 ton (4,900–7,400 GVWR max)
- F-350 (F35, F36): 1 ton (7,700–9,800 GVWR max)

Engines:

Engine	Years	Power
223 CID Mileage Maker I6	1958–1960	
272 CID Y-block V8	1958	
292 CID Y-block V8	1959–1960	

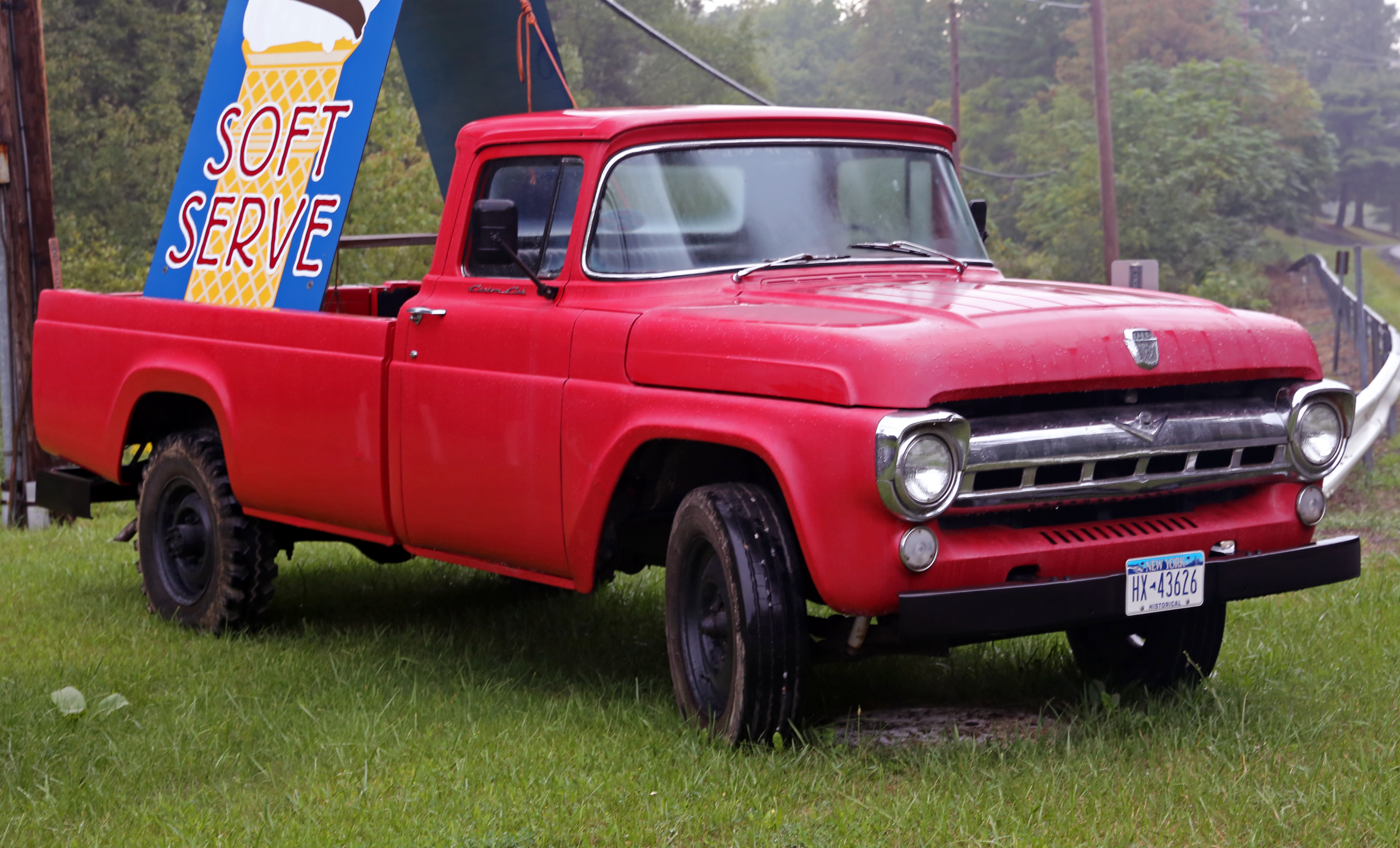
1957 Ford F-350 Styleside

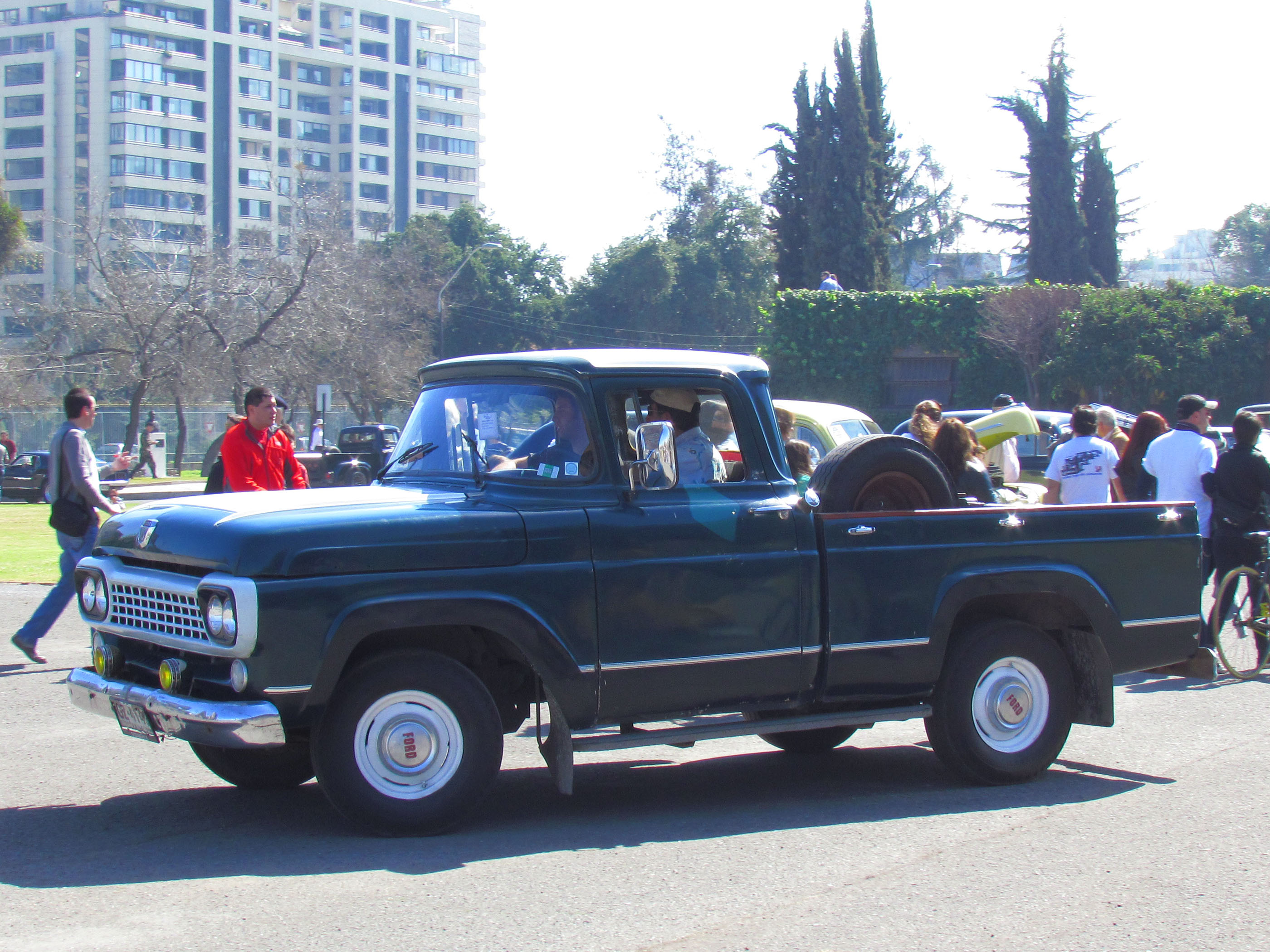
1958 Ford -F100

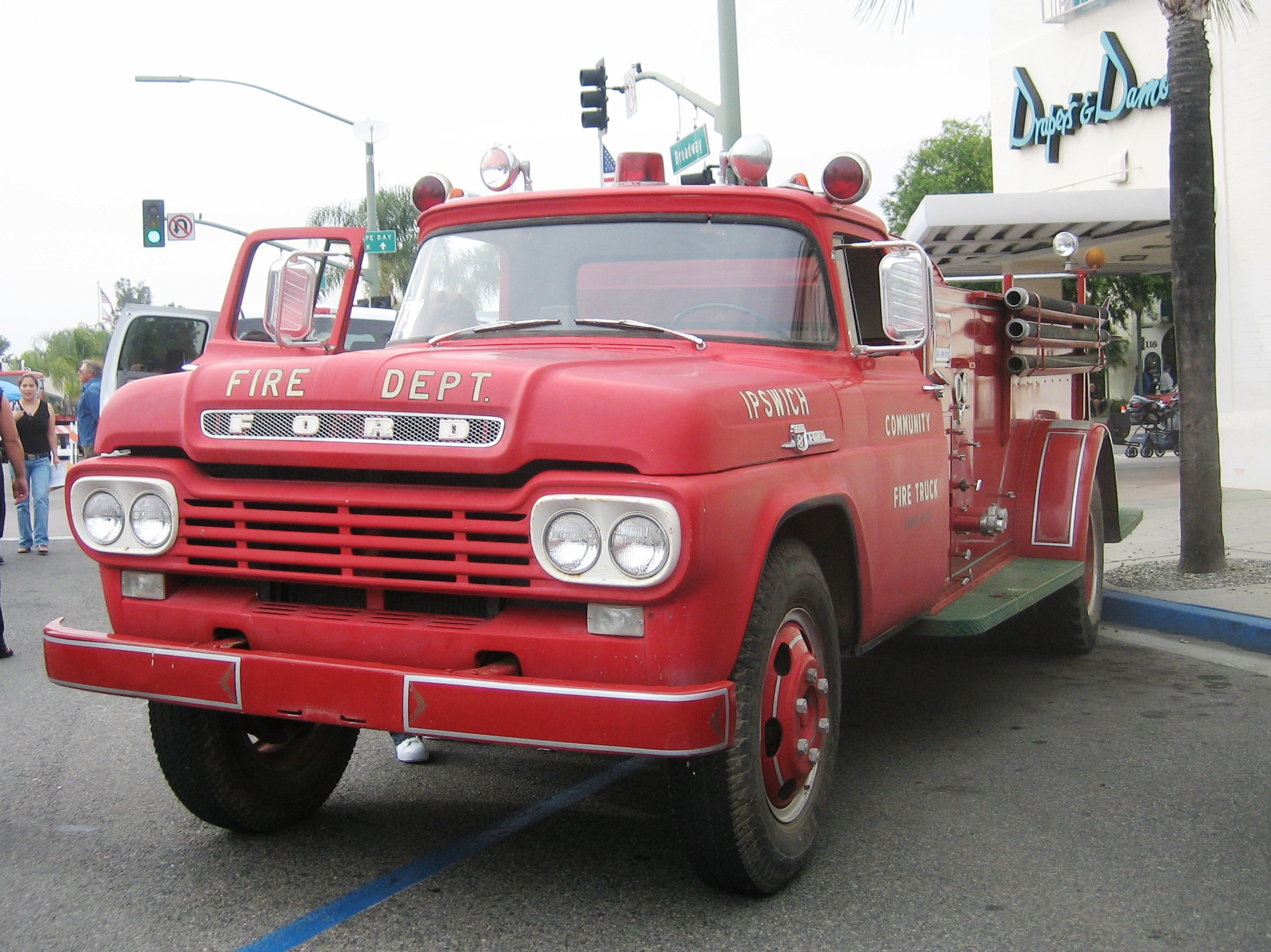
1959 Ford F-600 Fire Truck

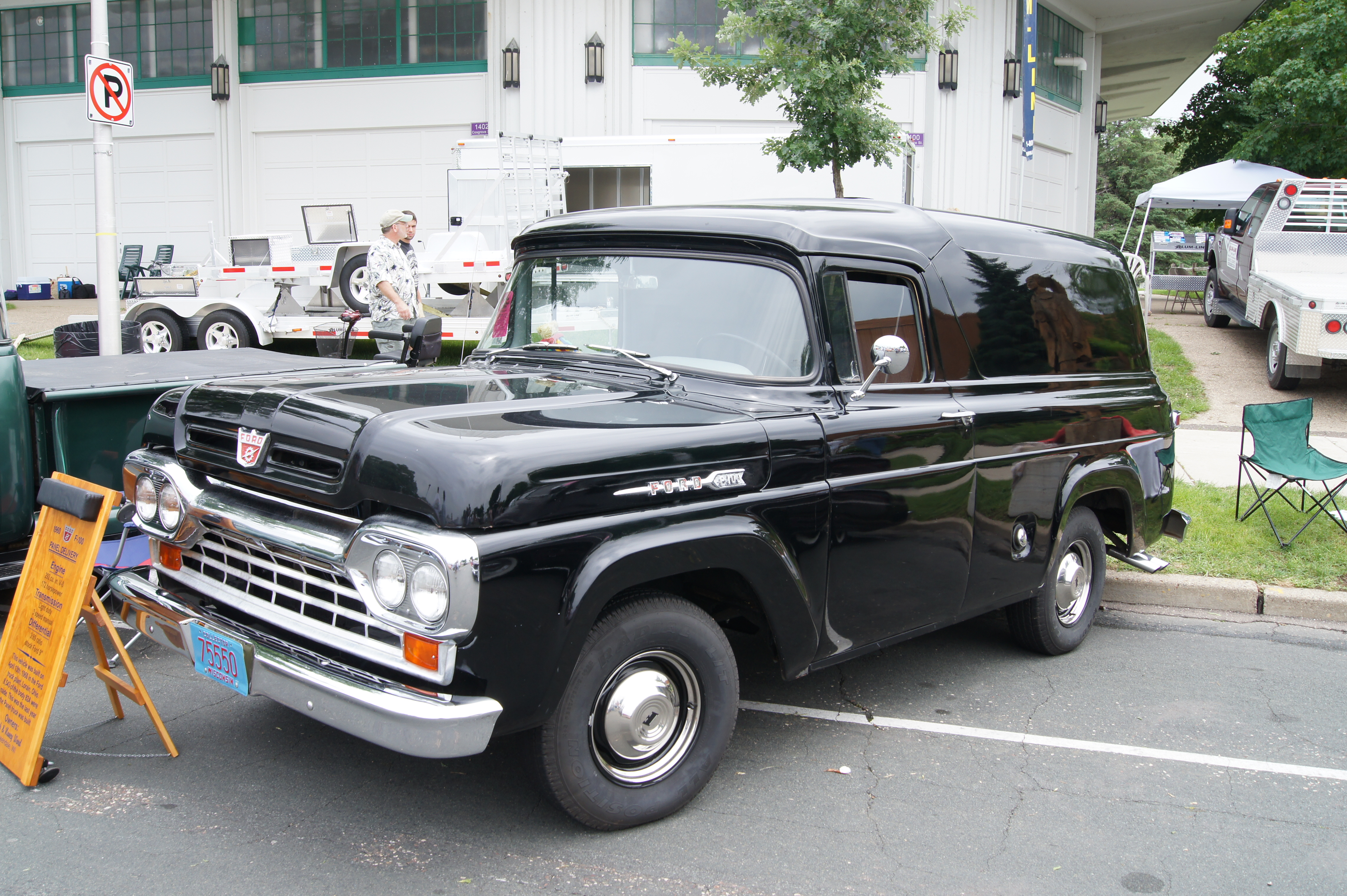
1960 Ford F-100 Panel Van

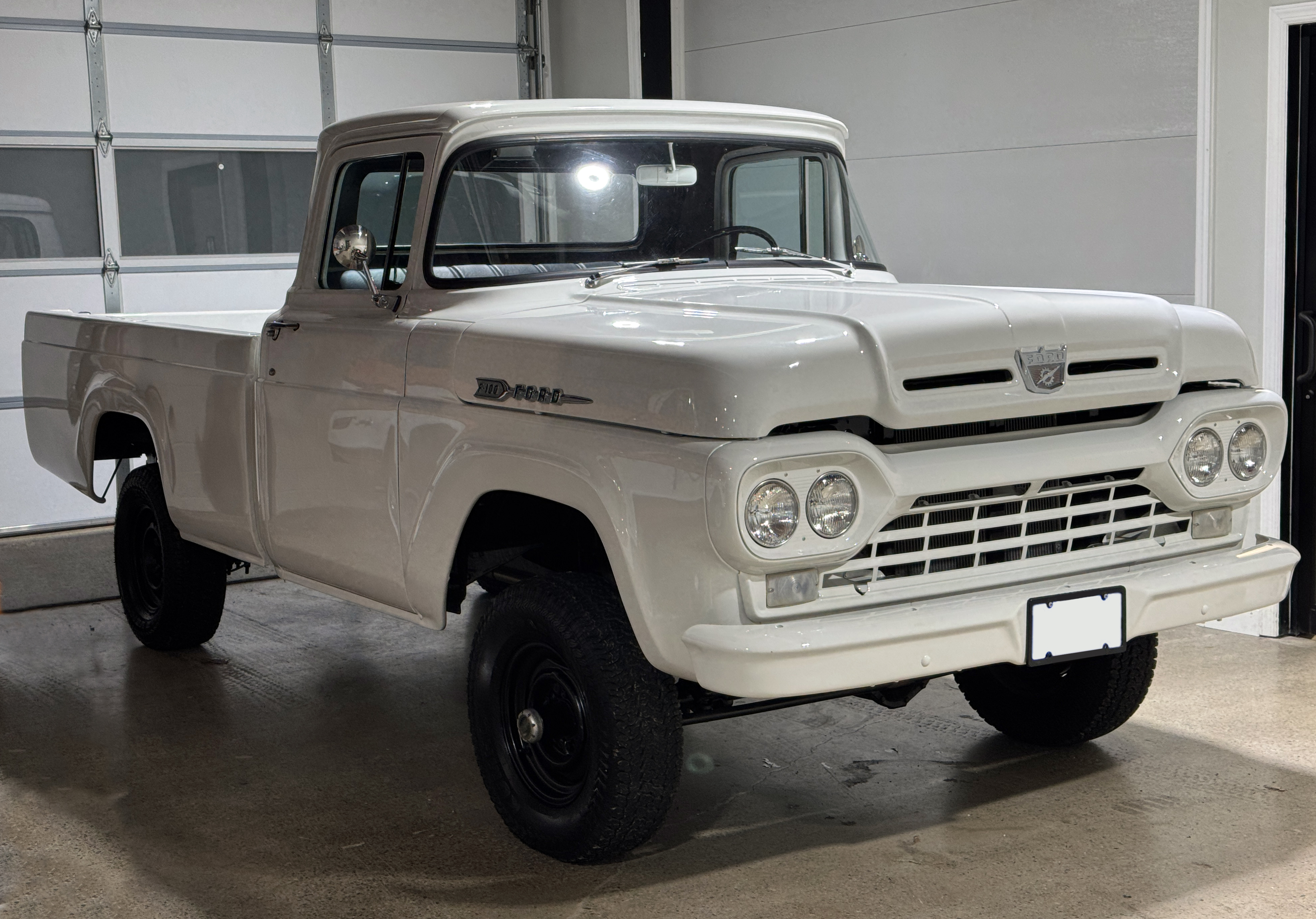
1960 Ford F-100 4x4 Styleside

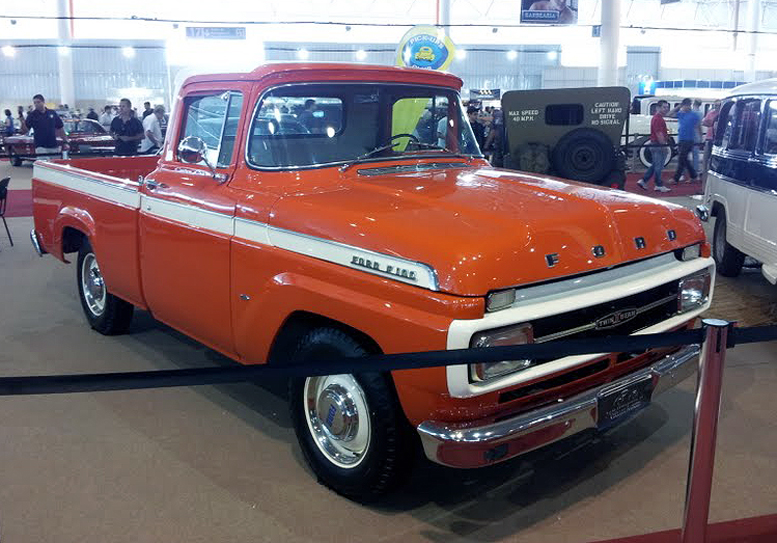
1970–1971 Brazilian-built Ford F-100

== Construction in Argentina ==
Third generation trucks were built in Argentina from 1959 to 1961 as the F-100 and F-600.
