= Ford F-Series (fourth generation) =

Fourth generation of the Ford F-Series pickup trucks

Fourth generation
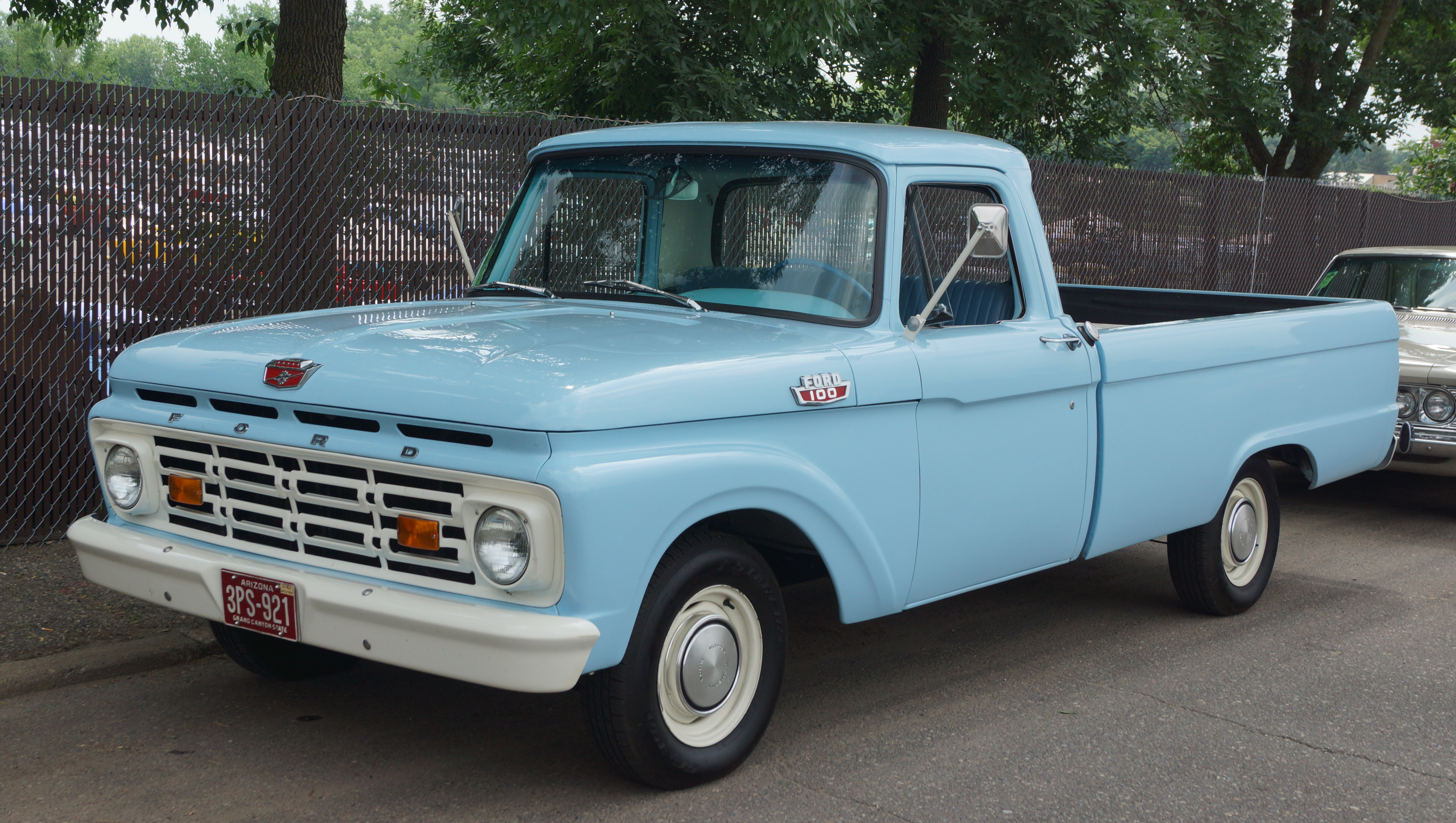
- 1964 Ford F100

Overview
- Manufacturer: Ford
- Also called: Mercury M-Series
- Production: October 1960 – August 1966
- Model years: 1961–1966
- Assembly: Dearborn, Michigan, USA; Chicago, Illinois, USA; Dallas, Texas, USA; Edison, New Jersey, USA; Hapeville, Georgia, USA; Kansas City, Missouri, USA; Long Beach, California, USA; Lorain, Ohio, USA; Louisville, Kentucky, USA; Norfolk Assembly (Norfolk, Virginia, USA); St. Louis, Missouri, USA; St. Paul, Minnesota, USA; San Jose, California, USA; Wayne, Michigan, USA; Oakville, Ontario, Canada (Ontario Truck Plant); Cuautitlán, Mexico; General Pacheco, Argentina (Ford Argentina); Salisbury, Rhodesia (FMCR)

Body and chassis
- Class: Full-size pickup truck
- Body style: 2-door standard cab 4-door crew cab
- Layout: Front engine, rear-wheel drive / four-wheel drive

Powertrain
- Engine: 223 CID (3.7 L) Mileage Maker I6; 292 CID (4.8 L) Y-block V8; 289 CID (4.7 L) Windsor V8; 240 CID (3.9 L) I6; 300 CID (4.9 L) I6; 352 CID (5.8 L) FE V8

Dimensions
- Wheelbase: 114 in (2,896 mm) (6.5' bed, 1961–64); 115 in (2,921 mm) (6.5' bed, 1965–66); 120 in (3,048 mm) (F-100/F-250 4x4); 122 in (3,099 mm) (8' bed, 1961–64); 129 in (3,277 mm) (8' bed, 1965–66); 132 in (3,353 mm) (F-350 9' bed); 147 in (3,734 mm) (F-250 crew cab, 1965–66); 152 in (3,861 mm) (F-350 crew cab, 1965–66)

Chronology
- Predecessor: Ford F-Series (third generation) (1957–1960)
- Successor: Ford F-Series (fifth generation) (1967–1972)

The fourth generation of the Ford F-Series is a line of trucks that was produced by Ford from the 1961 to 1966 model years. Introducing a lower and wider cab over the previous generation, Ford began refinement of the model line as it began to market it towards multi-vehicle households. Taking on an appearance closer in line with modern pickup trucks, the bed sides, hood lines, and window sill were designed with a uniform height; Ford returned to a two-headlight grille (a change that remained in place for over 50 years). Along with the first appearance of the crew cab configuration, the 1965 model year also marked the debut of the Ford Ranger nameplate.

This generation marked the introduction of multiple design changes. For 1961, Ford introduced its first "integrated" design, with the body stampings for the cab and Styleside pickup bed welded together (similar to the car-based Ford Ranchero). The F-Series panel van was discontinued, functionally replaced by the Ford Econoline. For 1963, the integrated pickup bed was discontinued, with Styleside beds again stamped separately. For 1965, the model line underwent a more substantial revision, introducing the chassis and cab that would be used by the F-Series through 1979; the long-running "Twin I-Beam" independent front suspension and 300 cubic-inch inline-6 were both introduced.

The model line was assembled by Ford across multiple facilities across the United States, Canada, and Mexico; the model line was also assembled by Ford Argentina. In Canada, the F-Series was again sold as the Mercury M-Series.

== Model history ==
=== 1960–1962 ===
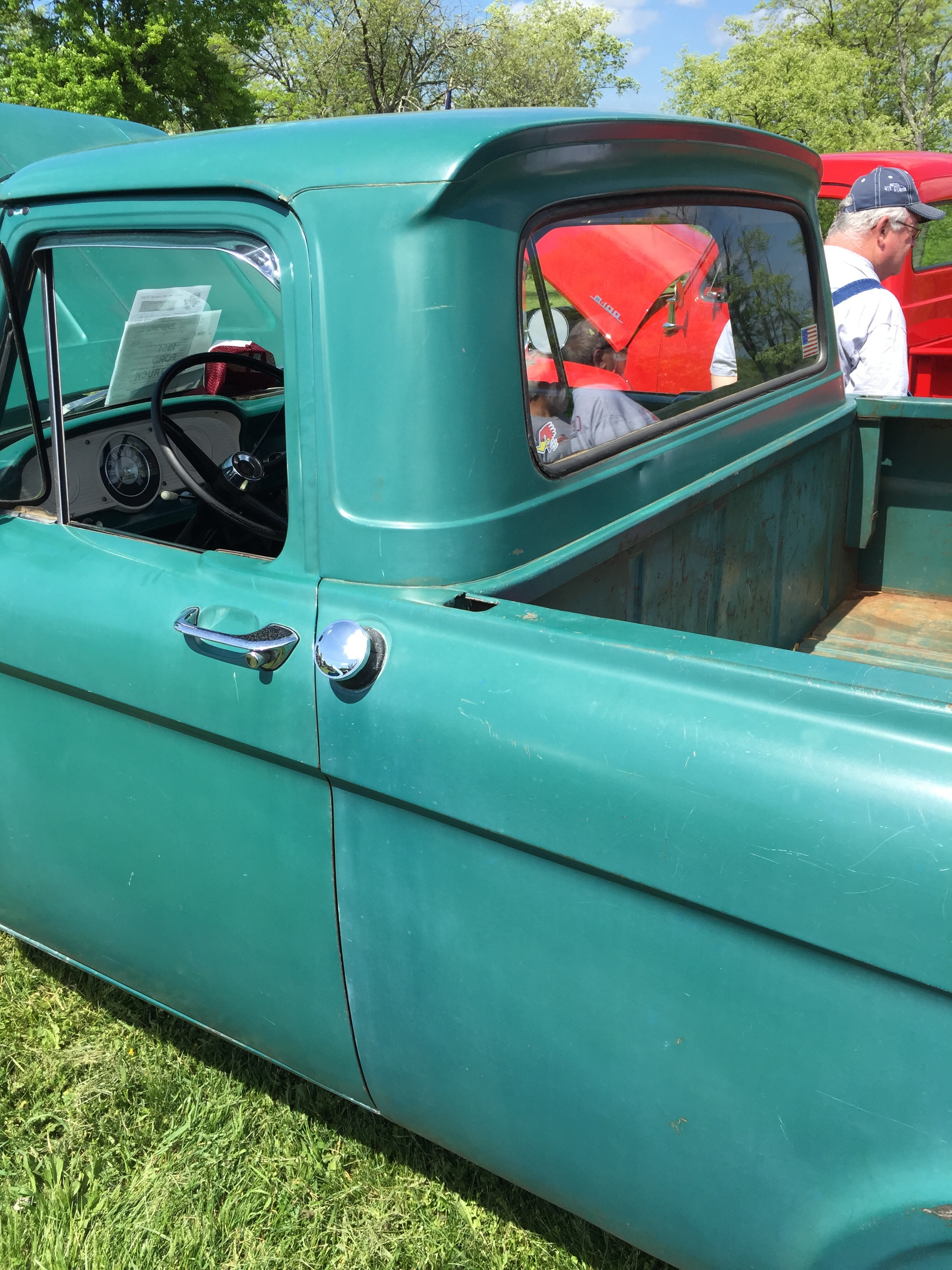
1961 "unibody" design

Along with the traditional separate Flareside beds, Ford introduced unibody trucks. These were originally named as the "integrated pickup" and consisted of the cab and the bed into one continuous piece, with no gap between them. The design required fewer stampings, such as the back of the cab served as the leading edge of the bed, less complicated assembly, such as the single-wall bed sides were spot-welded directly to the door sills, and the body had a less complicated path through the assembly plant's paint shop. This achieved cost savings in the manufacture of the truck, but the one-piece cab and bed body was still mounted to a traditional ladder frame chassis. Only two-wheel-drive F-100 and F-250 models used this one-piece construction—four-wheel-drive models and all F-350s, as well as all models with Flareside beds, continued to use separate cabs and beds. The Styleside bed design on the separate cab trucks was carried over from the 1957–60 models.

=== 1962–1964 ===
Due to poor market reception, and rumors that overloading caused the doors to jam shut, the unibody trucks were dropped midway through the 1963 model year. The 1961/64 models have the turn signals in the grille. 1964 models received an all-new Styleside bed with more modern styling as well as a longer wheelbase on two-wheel-drive trucks while short beds and 4x4 retained the earlier wheelbases.

=== 1965–1966 ===
In October 1964, the 1965 F-Series introduced an all-new frame, which would be used on the F-Series through 1979. The body itself remained largely unchanged, but on 1965 and 1966 models the turn signals are above the headlights. Replacing the rudimentary straight-axle in the front was all-new independent "Twin I-Beam" suspension with coil springs on two-wheel-drive trucks. The change in suspension also lengthened wheelbases slightly. 1965 and 1966 F-Series trucks are distinguished with a "TWIN I-BEAM" emblem on the front fender. A 4-door crew cab was also introduced on F-250 and F-350 models.

The 240 cu in (3.9 L) and 300 cu in (4.9 L) straight six was introduced. With the introduction of the 208 hp (155 kW; 211 PS) 352 cu in (5.8 L) FE V8, output surpassed 200 hp in the F-Series for the first time.

== Argentinian assembly 1961–1968 ==
First vehicles were made in the old plant of La Boca, in the Ciudad Autónoma de Buenos Aires. Starting in 1962, production was moved to General Pacheco, partido de Tigre (30 to the north). Using the Y-block and Diesel Perkins engines (like the 6-305 and 6-354), the F-100 (1/2 ton pickup model), F-350 (1 ton truck model), F-500 (4 ton truck model) and F-600 (5 ton truck) until 1968, when Ford Argentina launch the "punta de diamante" series.

== Mexican assembly 1965–1966 ==
New automotive assembly regulations and laws favoring domestic manufacture over imports were decreed by the Mexican government in 1962. After decades of Ford trucks built in Mexico from imported assembly kits, 1965 was first Mexican-built Ford truck in the recently open Cuautitlán Assembly in Cuautitlán Izcalli. The models included the F-100 (1/2 ton pickup model), F-350 (1 ton truck model) and F-600 (5 ton truck). The F-100 came in two versions: a chassis cab and pickup truck with a like-Ford F-Series third generation bed). The trucks were fitted with the 289 cu in (4.7 L) V8 engine that was introduced in the Mexican market of Ford pickups and medium-duty trucks, producing 160 hp (119 kW; 162 PS) at 4,000 RPM. These engines were also used in the Ford Mustang that was also manufactured in the Cuautitlán Assembly in Mexico.

== Models ==
- F-100 (F10, F14): 1/2 ton (4,000–5,000 GVWR max)
- F-100 (F11, F18, F19)(4×4): 1/2 ton (4,000–5,600 GVWR max)
- F-250 (F25): 3/4 ton (7,400 GVWR max)
- F-250 (F26)(4×4): 3/4 ton (4,900 GVWR max)
- F-350 (F35): 1 ton (9,800 GVWR max)

A Camper Special was available featuring heavier-duty components to accommodate the slide in campers that were becoming increasingly popular during this time.

For 1965, the Ranger name first appeared as a styling package for the F-Series pickup trucks. The interior featured bucket seats and a curtain over the gas tank which was behind the seats in the cab.

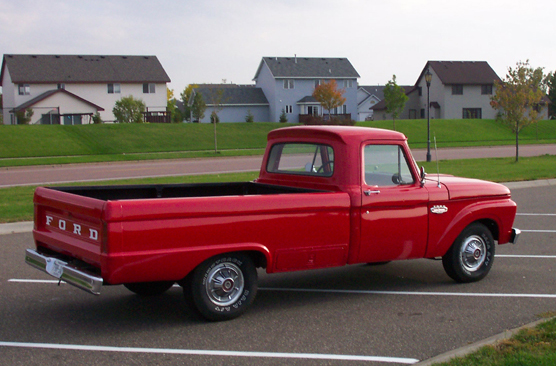
1966 Ford F-100 with optional toolbox on side of bed

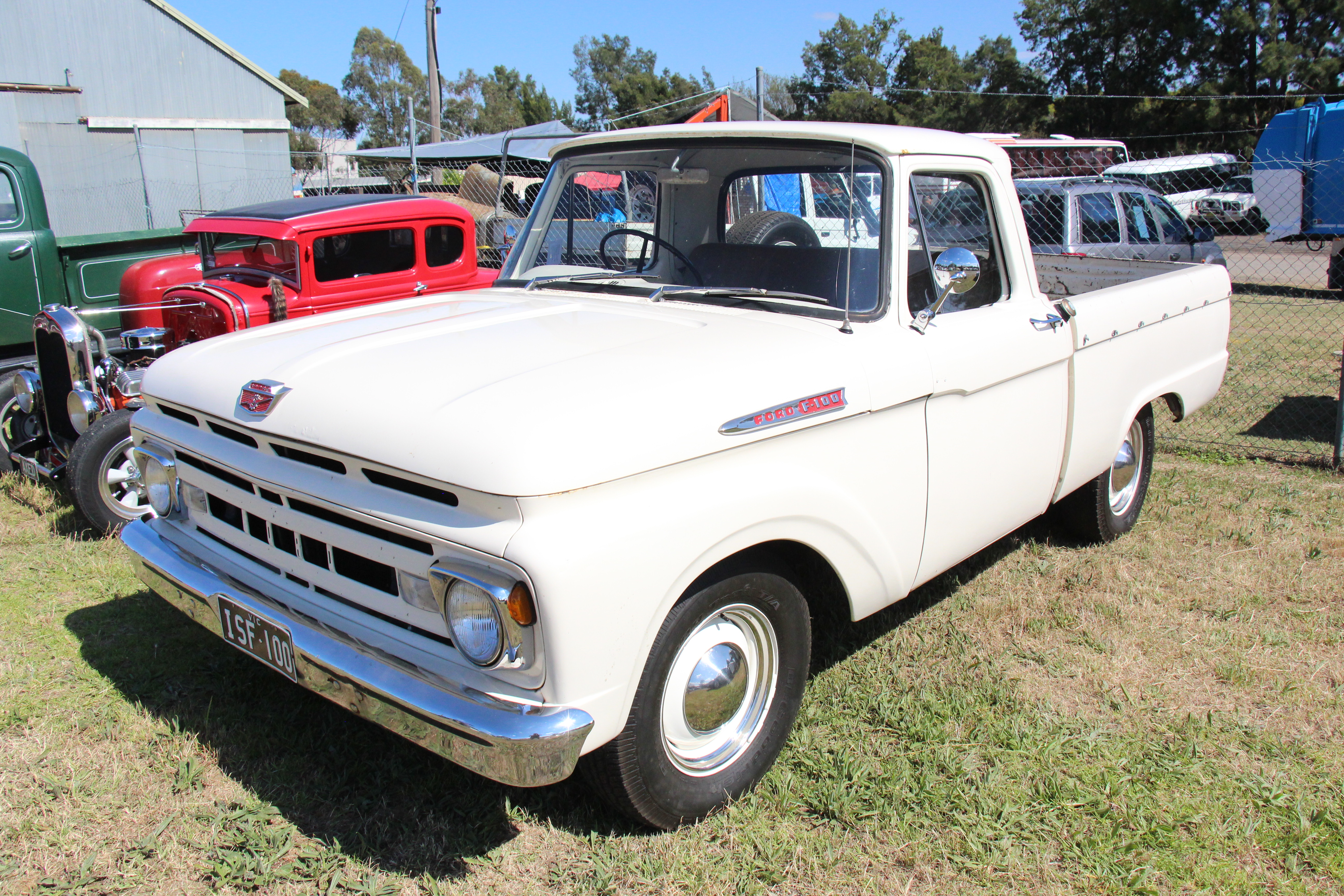
1961 Ford F-100 Pickup

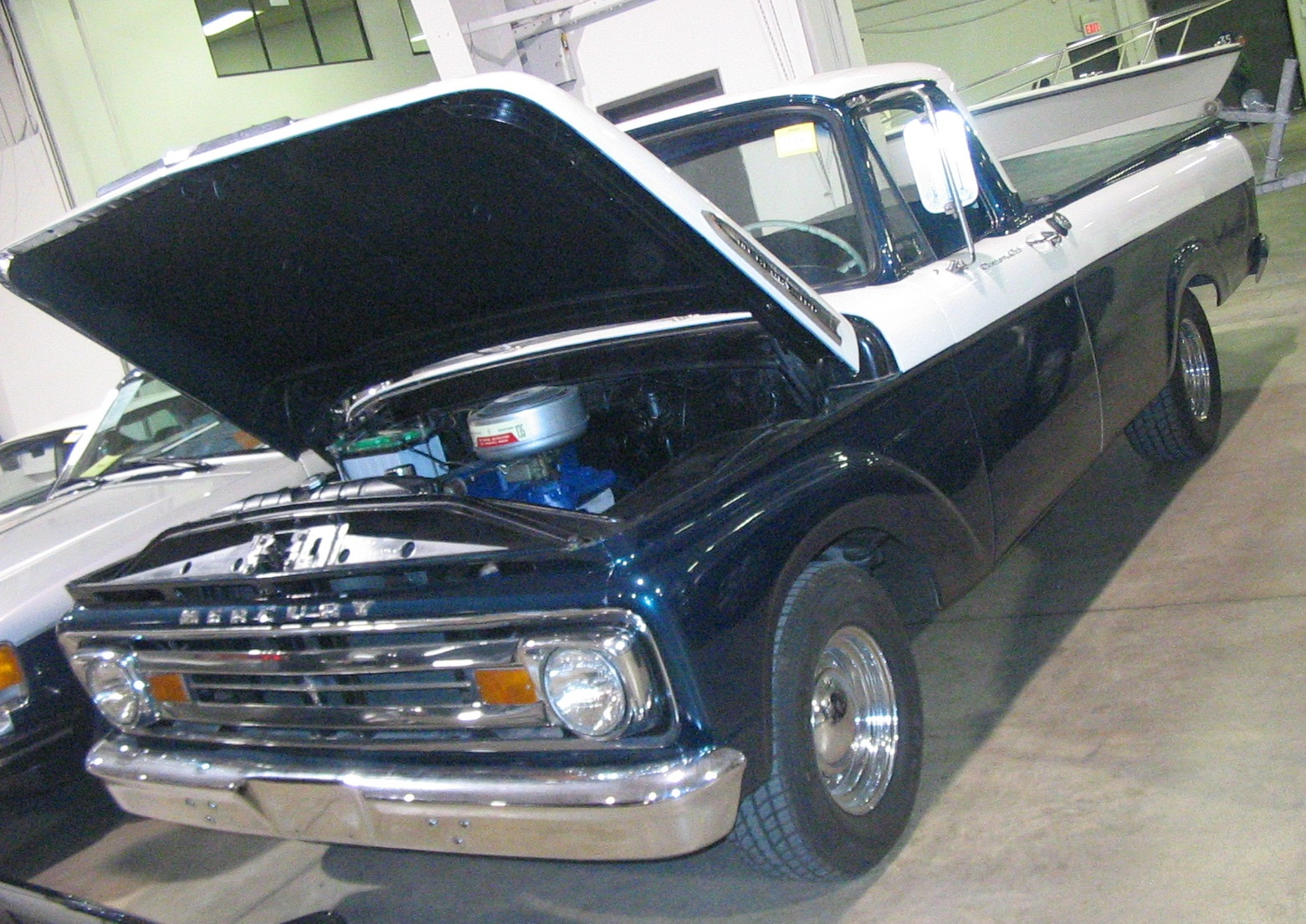
1962 Mercury M-100

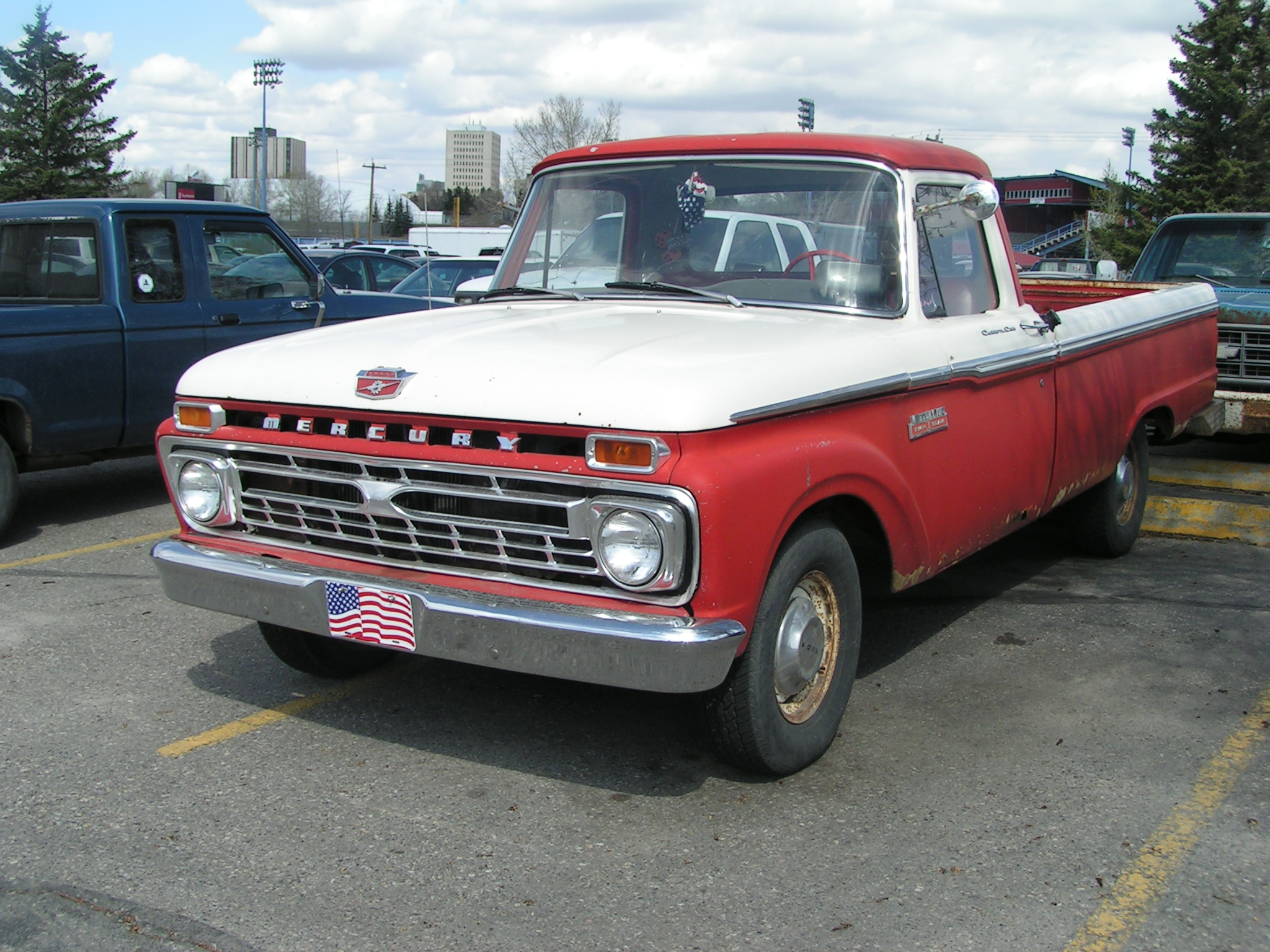
1966 Mercury M-100

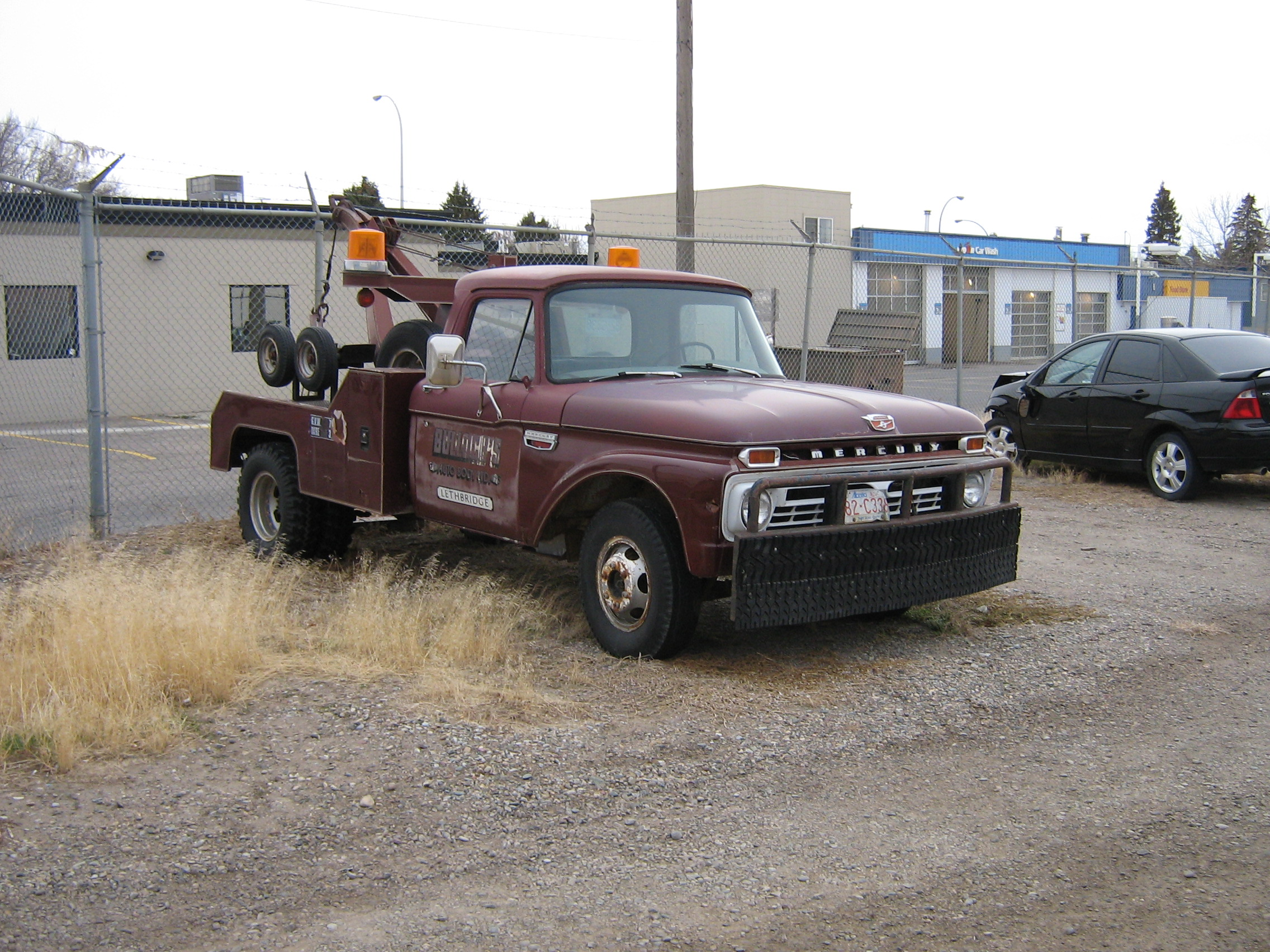
1966 Mercury M-350 Tow Truck

== Powertrain ==
Engine	Model Years	Power
223 CID Mileage Maker I6	1961–64	114 hp (85 kW)
262 CID Mileage Maker I6	1961–64	132 hp (98 kW)
292 CID Y-block V8	1961–64	170 hp (127 kW)
240 CID Straight-6	1965–66	150 hp (112 kW)
300 CID Straight-6	1965–66	170 hp (127 kW)
289 CID Windsor V8 (Mexico only)	1965–66	160 hp (119 kW)
352 CID FE V8	1964–66	208 hp (155 kW)

== F-Series Advertising ==
Advertising for the F-Series depicted the truck being used for farmwork and other labor. Words such as "reliable," "tough," "easy," and "cheap" were used in ads for Ford’s pickup trucks. The F-Series pickups were advertised with a 100,000 mile warranty. Ford advertised the F-Series with a variety of packages. Higher end trim packages had more luxurious features like cloth seats, two tone paint, and chrome accents. Lower trim packages were made for work trucks that featured basic trim and designed to be put to work.
