= Ford F-Series (fifth generation) =

Fifth generation of the Ford F-Series pickup trucks

Fifth generation Ford F-Series
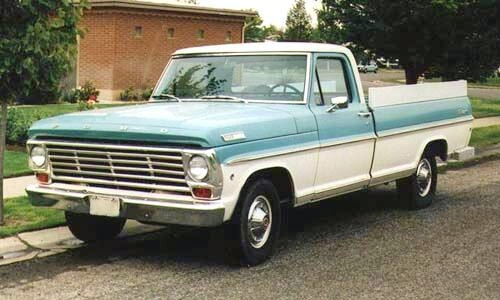
- 1967 Ford F-100 Ranger

Overview
- Manufacturer: Ford
- Also called: Mercury M-Series
- Production: 1966–1972; 1972–1992 (Brazil); 1968–1973 (Argentina)
- Model years: 1967–1972
- Assembly: Dearborn, Michigan, USA; Dallas, Texas, USA; Edison, New Jersey, USA; Hapeville, Georgia, USA; Kansas City, Missouri, USA; Long Beach, California, USA; Louisville, Kentucky, USA; Norfolk Assembly (Norfolk, Virginia, USA); St. Louis, Missouri, USA; St. Paul, Minnesota, USA; San Jose, California, USA; Wayne, Michigan, USA; Oakville, Ontario (Ontario Truck Plant), Canada; Cuautitlán, Mexico; General Pacheco, Argentina (Ford Argentina); São Paulo, Brazil (Ford Brazil); Casablanca, Chile; Valencia, Carabobo, Venezuela (Valencia Assembly); Broadmeadows, Australia (Ford Australia)

Body and chassis
- Class: Full-size pickup truck
- Body style: 2-door and 4-door pickup
- Layout: Front engine, rear-wheel / four-wheel drive

Powertrain
- Engine: Petrol; 140 CID (2.3 L) Lima I4 (Brazil); 170 CID (2.8 L) Thriftpower I6; 221 CID (3.6 L) I6 (Argentina); 240 CID (3.9 L) I6; 272 CID (4.5 L) Y-block V8 (Brazil); 289 CID (4.7 L) Windsor V8 (Mexico); 292 CID (4.8 L) Y-block V8 (Argentina); 300 CID (4.9 L) I6; 302 CID (5.0 L) Windsor V8; 335 CID (5.4 L) V8 (Mexico, medium-duty only); 352 CID (5.8 L) FE V8; 360 CID (5.9 L) FE V8; 390 CID (6.4 L) FE V8; Diesel; 203 CID (3.3 L) Perkins I4 diesel (Argentina); 239 CID (3.9 L) MWM D229-4 Naturally Aspirated I4 diesel (Brazil); 239 CID (3.9 L) MWM TD229-4 Turbocharged, non-intercooled I4 diesel (Brazil); 268 CID (4.4 L) Ford Diesel OHV Naturally Aspirated I4 Diesel (Brazil)
- Transmission: 3-speed manual 4-speed manual 3-speed automatic

Dimensions
- Wheelbase: 100: 115.0 in (2,921 mm) (short bed); 100: 131.0 in (3,327 mm) (long bed); 250: 131.0 in (3,327 mm); 250: 149.0 in (3,785 mm) (crew cab); 350: 135.0 in (3,429 mm) (short); 350: 159.0 in (4,039 mm) (long); 350: 164.5 in (4,178 mm) (crew cab)

Chronology
- Predecessor: Fourth generation F-series (1961–66)
- Successor: Sixth generation F-series (1973–79)

The fifth generation of the Ford F-Series is a line of pickup trucks and commercial trucks that were produced by Ford from the 1967 to 1972 model years. Built on the same platform as the fourth generation F-Series, the fifth generation had sharper styling lines, a larger cab, and expanded engine options.

Three trim levels were available during the production of the fifth generation F-Series, though the names were changed in 1970. The "Base" trim became the "Custom" and the "Custom Cab" became the "Sport Custom" joining "Ranger" as optional levels of equipment and trim. Late in production the Ranger trim level was upgraded with the additional "Ranger XLT" option.

== Year by year changes ==
- 1967: Introduction of fifth-generation F-Series in 1966 for the 1967 model year. Cab is 3 inches (7.6 cm) wider than its predecessor and the frame is heavier. Grille, exterior trim, interior cab fittings and engine choices are unique to this year. Trim levels are "Base", "Custom Cab", and "Ranger".
- 1968: As federal regulations required all automotive manufacturers to install side marker reflectors or lights, Ford redesigned the hood emblems to incorporate reflectors as well as added reflectors to the rear of the bed. Interior fittings changed due to new safety standards. New versions of the FE-Series engine added (360 truck and 390). First year of factory-installed air conditioning (air conditioning was installed by the dealer before 1968).
- 1969: New grille design, new 302 Windsor V8 engine option. The rebadged Mercury M-Series was discontinued.
- 1970: Mid-cycle update with many detail changes including a completely new grille including wraparound front turn signals, exterior trim changes, and new side marker lights. "Sport Custom" trim replaces "Custom Cab", and "Ranger XLT" added as top trim level.

=== Argentina ===
A new engine choice to the local market is introduced in that year: the diesel engine, which was a Perkins 3.3 L (203 cu in) I4 engine with 120 hp SAE at 3,000 RPM. Also, another change is the alternator, replacing the dynamo.

=== Mexico ===
The new 335 cu in (5.4 L) V8 engine was introduced as a new engine option, only in medium duty trucks. This engine was designed by Mexican Ford engineers and was relative of the Windsor family and was based in the 351 and 302 ones, with a stronger crankshaft and elongated stroke. The 335 had a Holley 2-barrel carburetor and had an output of 200 hp at 4,000 RPM. This engine co-existed with the 289 cu in V8 up to 1972.

- 1971: New grille inserts, steering wheel design, and colors. AM/FM radios are added as an option.
- 1972: Final year of production (in North America). Minor detail changes and power brakes become a new option on upper level trim options.

== Special models ==
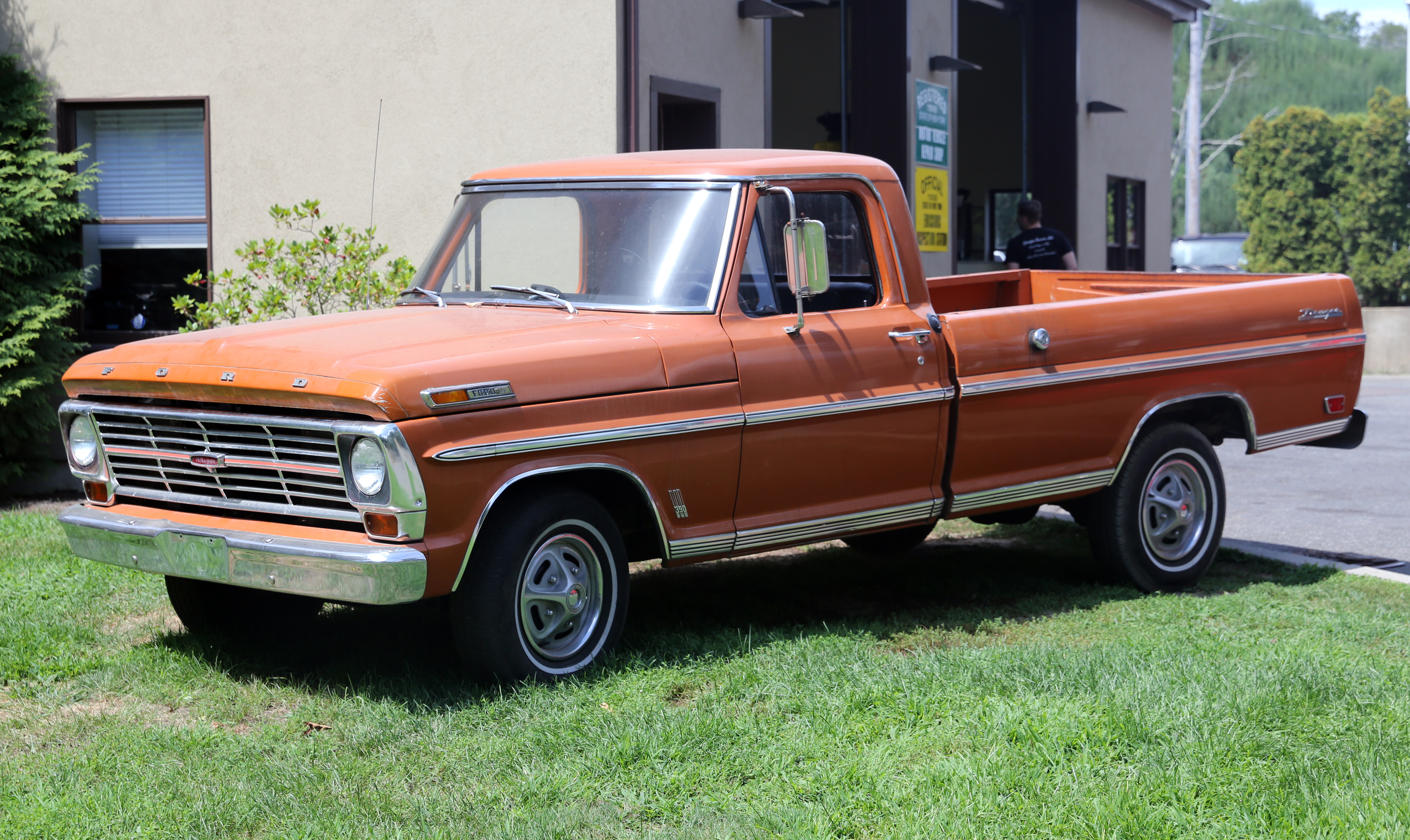
1969 Ford F-100 Ranger

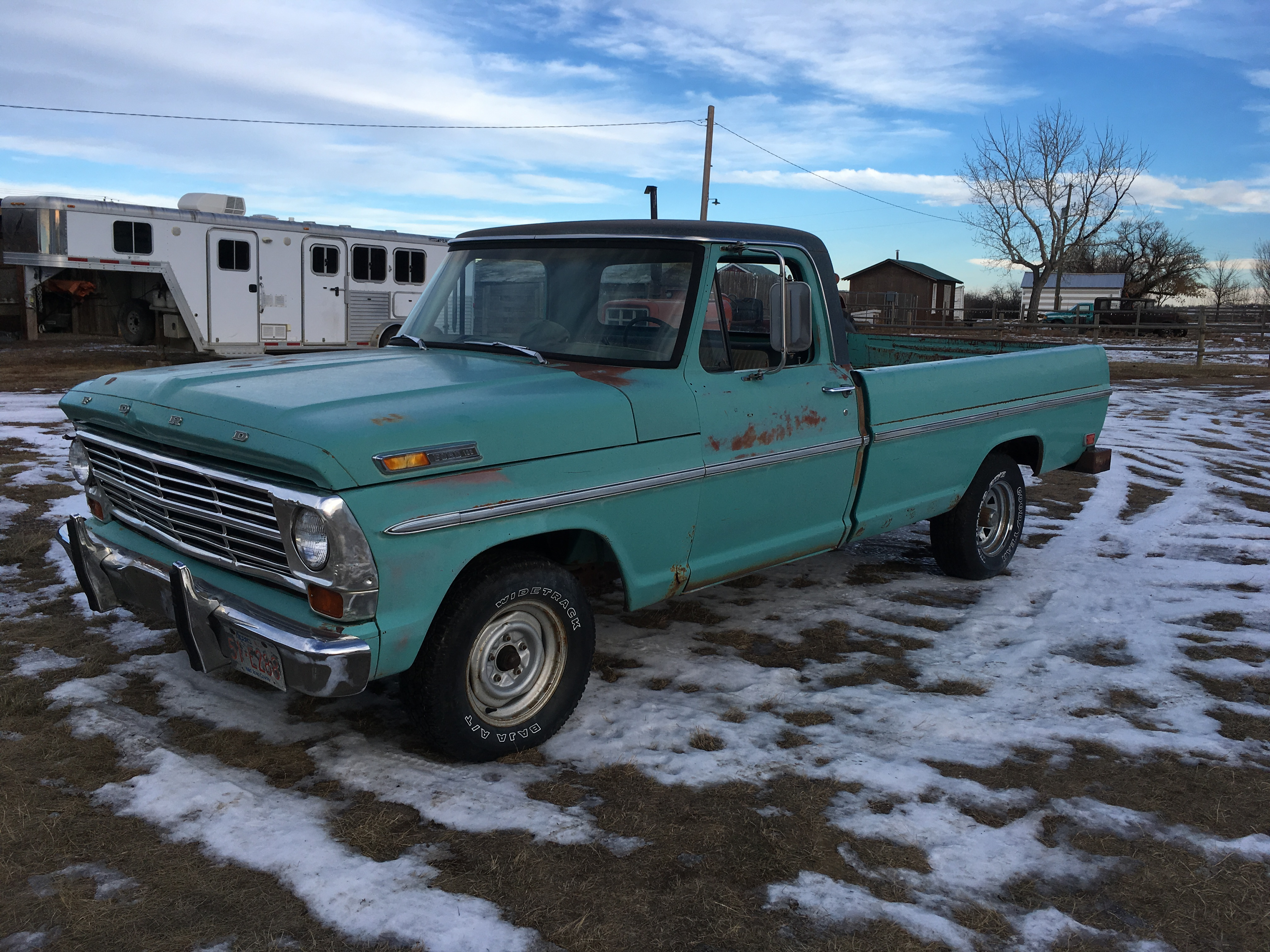
A 1969 Ford F-100 Explorer (Canada)

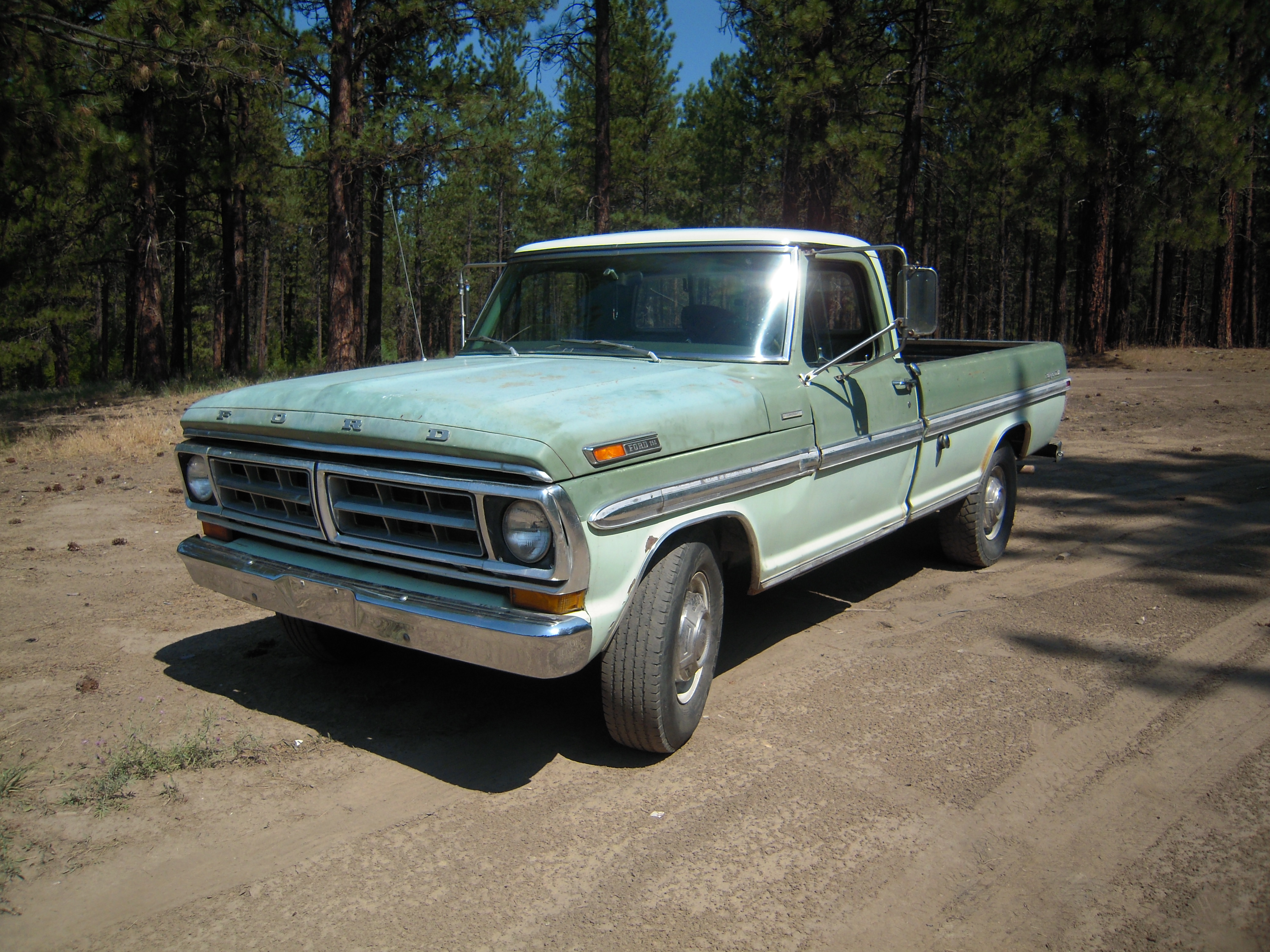
1971 F-250 Camper Special

After 1968, Ford discontinued the "Low GVWR" versions. Still available was the Camper Special option (heavy duty cooling, camper pre-wiring, and larger alternator) along with the new Explorer Special (a limited edition trim and option package that combined many of the "Ranger" trim pieces with a lower overall price), Contractor's Special (including a behind the seat toolbox and 3/4 ton (F-250) suspension), Farm and Ranch Special (extra sideboards and heavy springs), and Heavy-Duty Special (extra hauling abilities). These special models had various levels of options factory installed to appeal to different target groups.

== Argentina ==
The fifth-generation F-Series was introduced in Argentina in 1968, where it remained in production until circa 1973. Was made in the following models: F-100, F-350 the medium duty truck F-600 and the F-700. It remained almost on par with the US range, without major chronological mismatches, in terms of the renewal of the range. The local make Igarreta, provides some interesting versions with custom configurations for private companies and also for the Argentine State.

== Brazil ==
See also: Ford F-1000

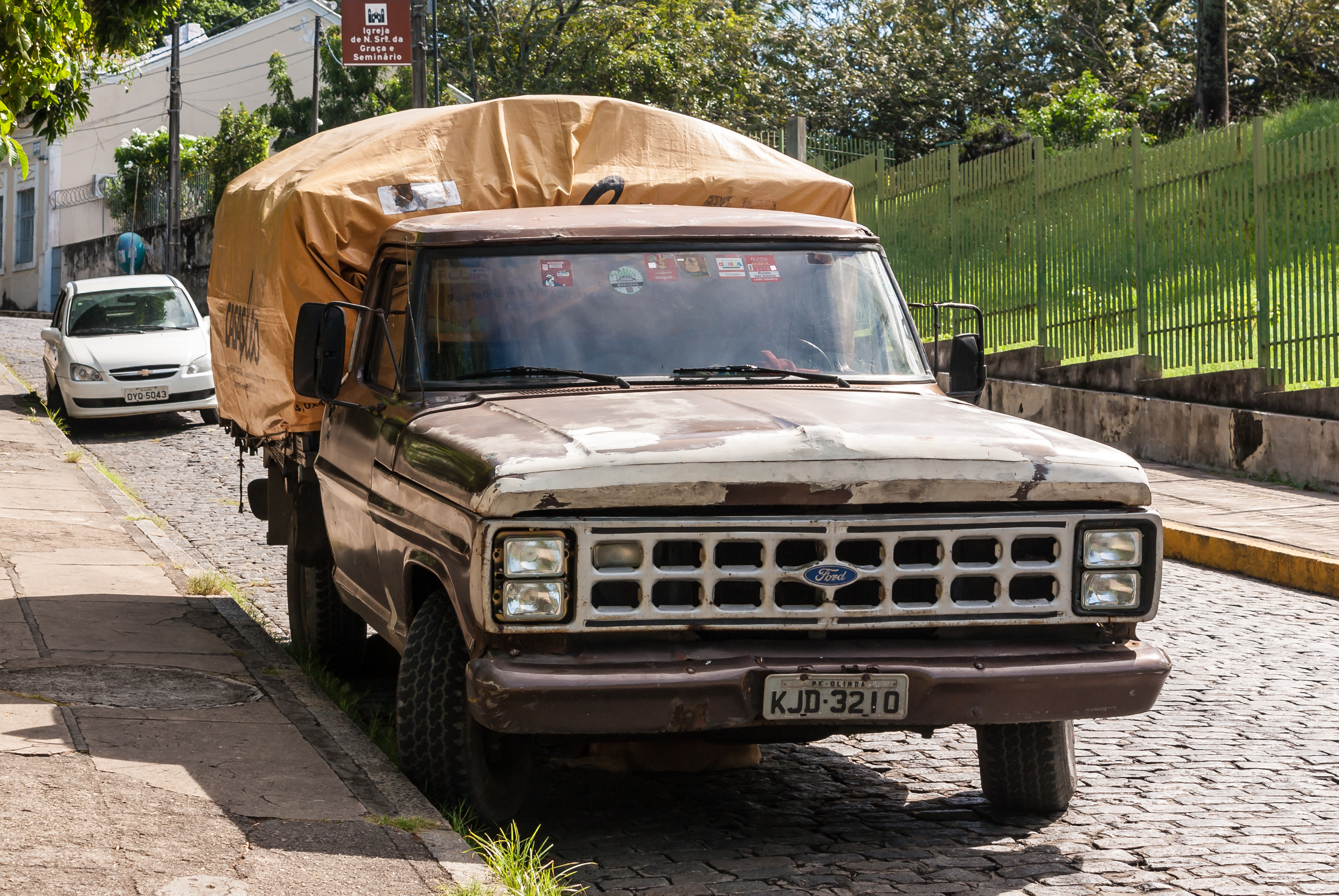
1985 Ford F-1000 with later model grille and headlights and aftermarket bed

The fifth-generation F-Series was introduced in Brazil in 1972, where it remained in production until 1992. It was divided in eight different models: F-100, F-100A, F-1000, F-1000A, F-2000, F-350, F-400 and F-4000.

The F-100 was offered with the gasoline-powered Y-Block 272 V8 168hp (1972 - 1976) and the Lima OHC 2.3L inline-four (1976 - 1986) in both gasoline (99hp) and dedicated ethanol (F-100A 1983-1986 84hp) versions. The F-100 was discontinued in 1986.

All models were only available in a single cab, short box body style, and 2-wheel drive.

The F-1000 was produced since 1979 until 1992. Available with diesel and petrol engines only as a 2-door regular cab body style with two-wheel drive.

The F-1000 was originaly a diesel only version, with the MWM D229-4 naturally aspirated 86hp engine and had a turbocharged 119hp option from 1990 to 1992.

It was also available from 1985 to 1992 the F-1000A, with an Argentinian 221cid 3.6 Falcon engine running on ethanol (111hp) and from 1990 to 1992 as F-1000 on gasoline (108hp).

The F-1000 had a 1 ton cargo capacity per legislation and the F-100 had 750 kg cargo capacity.

All F-100/F-1000 models were only available in a single cab, short box body style, and 2-wheel drive.

The F-350 was offered as a chassis cab only model from 1972 to 1976 with the gasoline-powered Y-Block 272 V8 161hp and a 3,40 m whellbase.

The F-400 was introduced in 1974 and last until 1976 with a sligther longer wheelbase (4 m) and heavier payload capacity. It was also powered by the same engine but with 163hp.

The F-4000 was introduced in 1974 with the same spec as the F-400 but with a MWM D226-4 naturally aspirated diesel engine with 99hp that last until 1984 when it was succed by the MWM D229-4 with 85hp that lasted until 1992. There was also a FORD 4.4-liter (268 cubic-inch) 4-cylinder diesel engine used in Ford tractors like the Ford 6610 (from the 10 Series) available starting from 1982 to 1992 with 90hp.

The last light duty model was the F-2000, a F-1000 chassis only version, available from 1980 to 1985, with the MWM D229-4 and the FORD 4.4 (1982-1985).

There was only one facelift in 1986 with dual squared headlights and a squared grille.

The Medium-Duty F-Series was also made in Brazil.

== Canada ==
In Canada, the Explorer Special was a trim level that sat between the base model truck and Custom Cab. It used the Custom Cab trim and grille but didn't include things like a radio.

== Models ==
- F-100: 1/2 ton (5,500 GVWR max)
- F-100: 1/2 ton (4x4) (5,600 GVWR max)
- F-250: 3/4 ton (up to 8,100 GVWR max)
- F-250: 3/4 ton (4×4) (8,200 GVWR max)
- F-350: 1 ton (up to 10,000 GVWR max)

=== Bed options ===
Styleside on F-100 and F-250. 6.5' and 8' lengths.

Flareside on all models, 6.5', 8' and 9' (F-350 only) lengths.

Platform stakes on F-250 and F-350 in 9' and 12' lengths.

=== Cab options ===
Standard cab on all models.

Crew cab with seating for six and four doors optional on F-250 and F-350.

== Engines ==
Engine	Years	Power
170 CID Thriftpower I6	1967-1972	105 hp (78 kW)
240 CID I6	1967–1972	150 hp (112 kW) 121 hp (90 kW)
300 CID I6	1967-1972	170 hp (127 kW) 165 hp (123 kW)
352 CID FE V8	1967	208 hp (155 kW)
360 CID FE V8	1968–1972	215 hp (160 kW) 196 hp (146 kW)
390 CID FE V8	1968–1972	255 hp (190 kW) 201 hp (150 kW)
302 CID Windsor V8	1969–1972	205 hp (153 kW) 154 hp (115 kW)

NOTE: HP ratings sourced from original Ford truck dealer brochures and 1967 Mercury/Ford Truck owners manual (170 CID)

== Medium-Duty F-series ==
The heavier duty models (F-500 and up) continued to be built on the fifth generation chassis even after the lighter-duty models were replaced. In 1977, the lightest F-500 was discontinued, leaving the F-600 as the lightest of the medium-duties. It was built until the introduction of the seventh generation F-series in late 1979.
