= Ford F-1000 =

Pickup truck produced by Ford Brasil

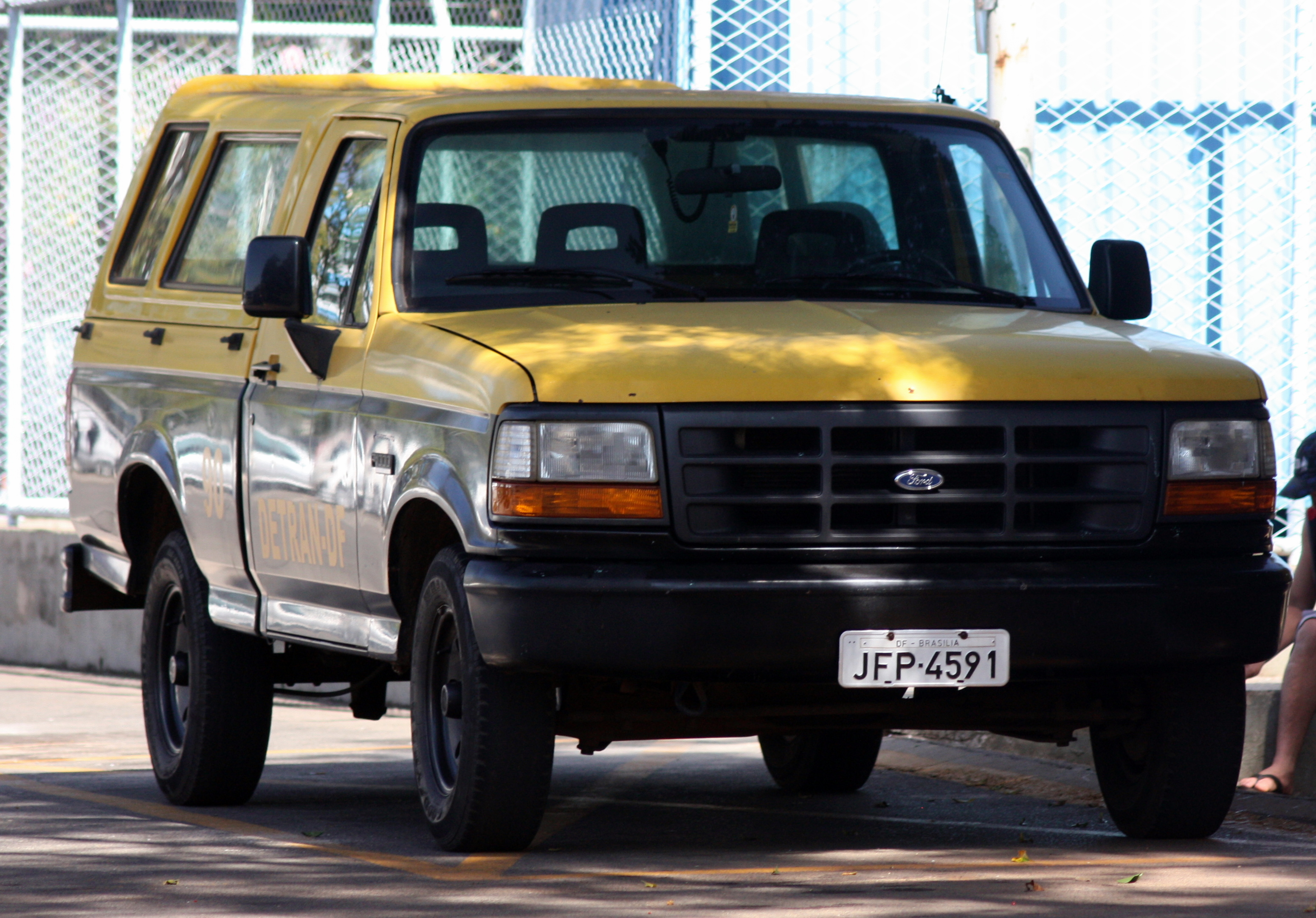

Overview
- Manufacturer: Ford do Brasil
- Model years: 1979 - 1998
- Assembly: São Paulo, Brazil (Ford Brazil); General Pacheco, Argentina (Pacheco Stamping and Assembly)

Body and chassis
- Class: Full-size pickup truck
- Body style: 2-door regular cab; 2-door extended cab (SuperCab)
- Layout: Front engine, rear-wheel drive; Front engine, four-wheel drive

Chronology
- Successor: Ford F-250

The Ford F-1000 is a line of pickup trucks produced by Ford Brazil from the 1979 to 1998 model years. Its production spanned through three generations.

The diesel-equipped models were the most popular, though ethanol or gasoline engines were available throughout most of the production. Four-speed and five-speed manual transmissions were available. Four-wheel drive was also available.

== First generation (1979–1992) ==
First generation

Overview
- Model years: 1979-1992

Body and chassis
- Layout: Front engine, rear-wheel drive
- Related: Ford F-Series (fifth generation)

Powertrain
- Engine: Petrol; 221 CID (3.6 L) Ford straight-six engine; Diesel; 239 CID (3.9 L) MWM D2229-4 Naturally Aspirated I4 diesel; 239 CID (3.9 L) MWM TD229-4 Turbocharged, non-intercooled I4 diesel
- Transmission: 4-speed manual; 5-speed manual

Dimensions
- Wheelbase: 2910 mm
- Length: 4850 mm
- Width: 1890 mm
- Height: 1820 mm

Production started in 1979. It was a model that sat between the F100 and the F4000. It shared the 87 horsepower, four-cylinder, 3.9-liter MWM D229-4 inline-four diesel engine paired with a four-speed manual transmission with the previously introduced F4000. It shared its basis with the F-100. In 1985, an ethanol-powered version became available, called F-1000A, it had a 3.6 liter inline-six engine. 1986 brought big changes with the replacement of the aluminum grille and two round headlights with a plastic grille and four square headlights, a sunroof also became available that year. 1987 introduced new wheel designs that would remain until the end of production in 1992. In 1988, the rear axle was replaced and reverse lights were incorporated into the series. In 1989, a five-speed manual transmission became an option with the MWM diesel engine, the 3.6 straight-six also became available in a gasoline version, and new, more modern, plastic exterior mirrors were introduced alongside a sliding rear window, and all of these remained until the end of production. 1990 introduced internal hood release, meaning the hood could no longer be opened from the outside. 1991 introduced the F-1000 Turbo, powered by a 119–horsepower turbocharged, non-intercooled version of the MWM diesel called TD229-4, this model was offered alongside the naturally aspirated F-1000 and was available until the end of production, this year power windows, locks and mirrors became available as options and the F-1000 turbo had them as standard equipment, also new was a plastic fuel tank replacing the previous metal tank. 1992 was a carryover from the 1991 model year and it was the last year the first generation F-1000 was made, alongside the first generation F-4000.
