= Mercury M-Series =

Mercury M-series trucks
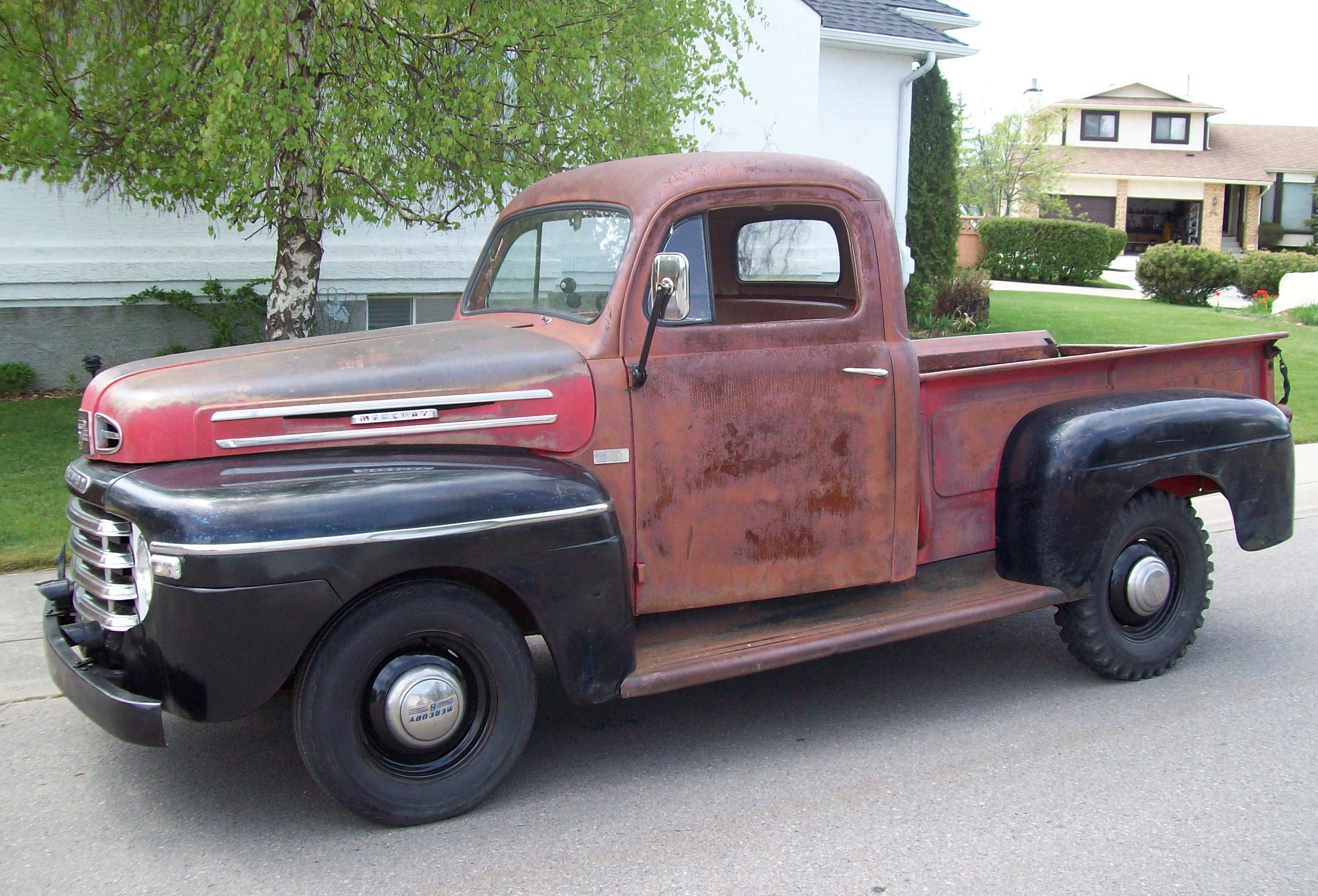
- Unrestored 1949 Mercury M47 half ton

Overview
- Manufacturer: Mercury (Ford)
- Production: 1947–1968

Body and chassis
- Class: Full-size pickup truck
- Layout: Front engine, rear-wheel drive Front engine, four-wheel drive

Chronology
- Predecessor: Unnamed Mercury trucks (pre-1947)
- Successor: Ford F series (1967–1972)

The Mercury M-Series is a series of pickup trucks that was marketed by the Mercury division of Ford Motor Company. Produced from 1947 to 1968, the Mercury M series was sold primarily in Canada, as a rebadged version of the Ford F-Series.

== Background ==
In 1946, Ford of Canada split its Ford and Lincoln/Mercury divisions into separate sales networks. Alongside the creation of the Monarch and Meteor sub-brands, Ford of Canada introduced trucks to the Mercury division. At the time, few rural communities offered both the Ford and Lincoln-Mercury dealership networks, miniminizing model overlap and allowing for greater coverage for potential truck buyers. To differentiate Ford and Mercury trucks, Mercury added a brand-specific grille and slightly different exterior and interior trim.

== Nomenclature ==
In 1948, following the introduction of the Ford F-Series, Mercury adopted the use of the "M" prefix, for Mercury. From 1948 to 1950, nominal tonnage ratings were replaced by a series designation in which the numbers indicate the GVWR when equipped with tires of appropriate capacity. Each code number is arrived at by dividing the GVWR of the series by 100. Thus an F-47 (M-47) indicates a GVWR of 4700 lbs., F-135 (M-135) indicates 13500 lbs., etc.

In 1951–52, Ford of Canada got back in step with Ford USA with F-1 (M-1), F-2 (M-2) etc.

== Pickup trucks ==
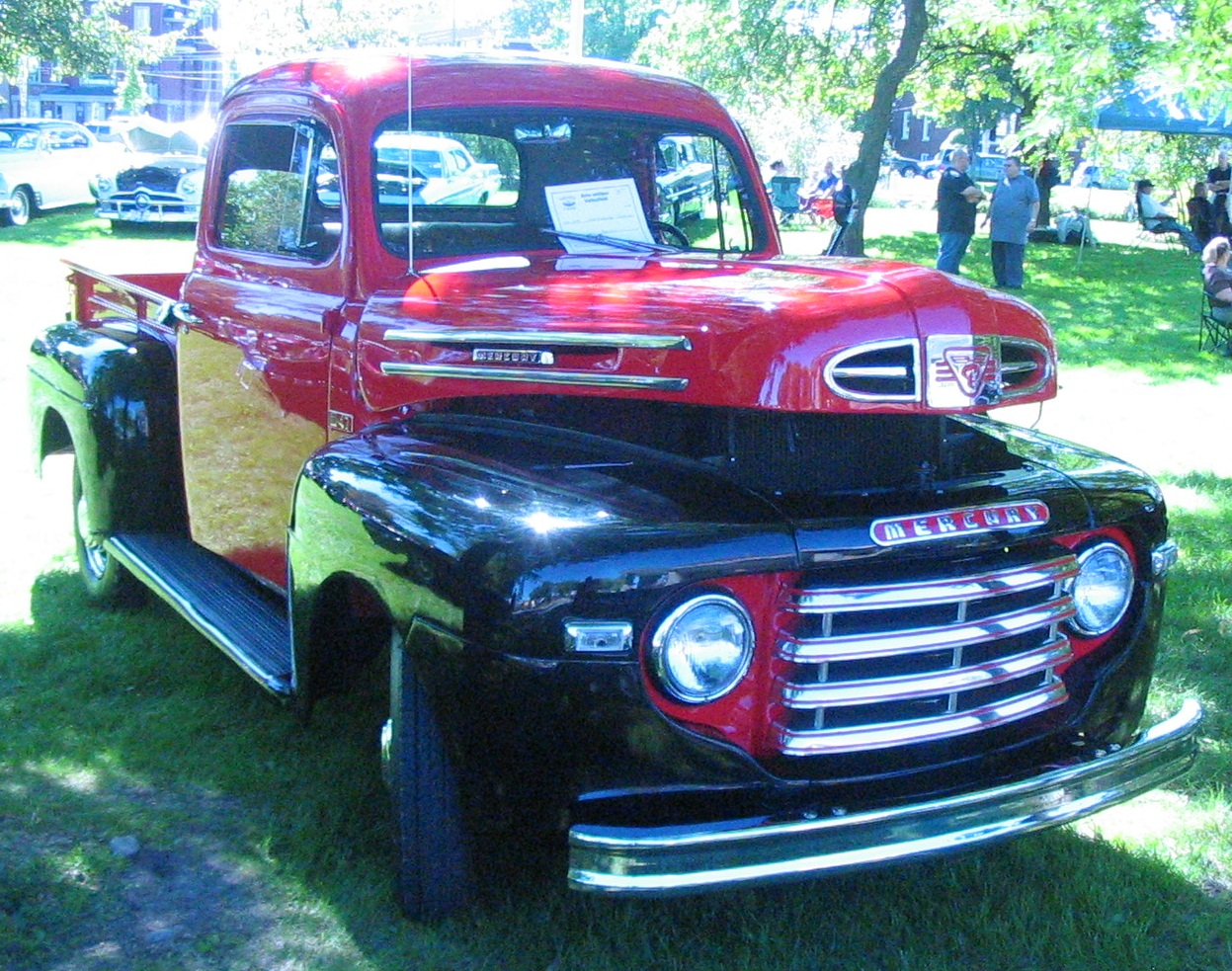
1949 Mercury M series

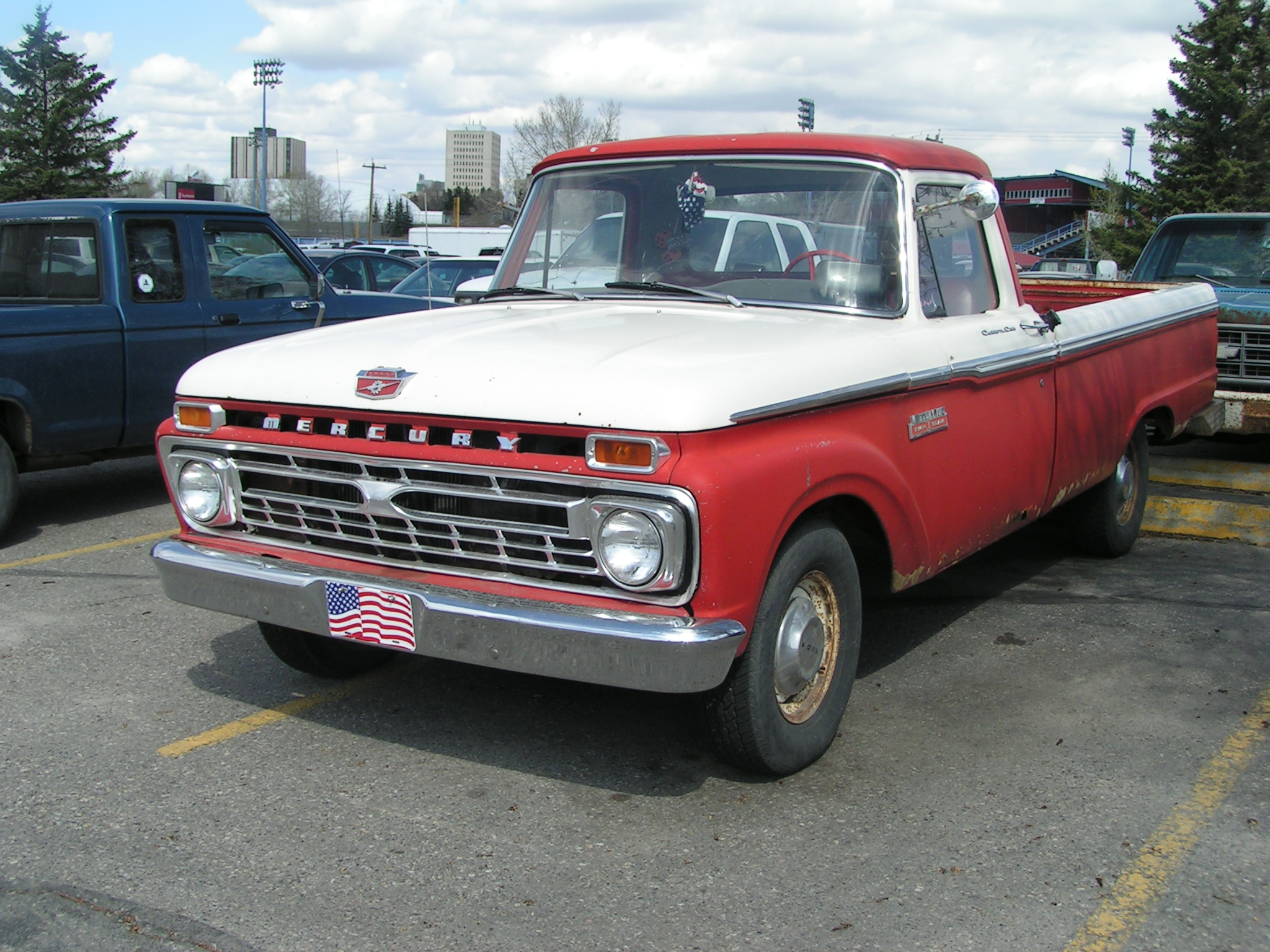
1966 Mercury M-100

From 1948 to 1968, the Mercury M-series followed the development of its Ford F-series counterparts, differing largely in exterior trim.

For 1961 to 1966, Mercury trucks had a gear/lightning bolt symbol on their horn button and no other interior Mercury nameplates.

For 1967 and 1968, trucks used Ford interior trim only, such as the horn button, dash cluster bezel and radio block-off plate.

== Other Mercury trucks ==
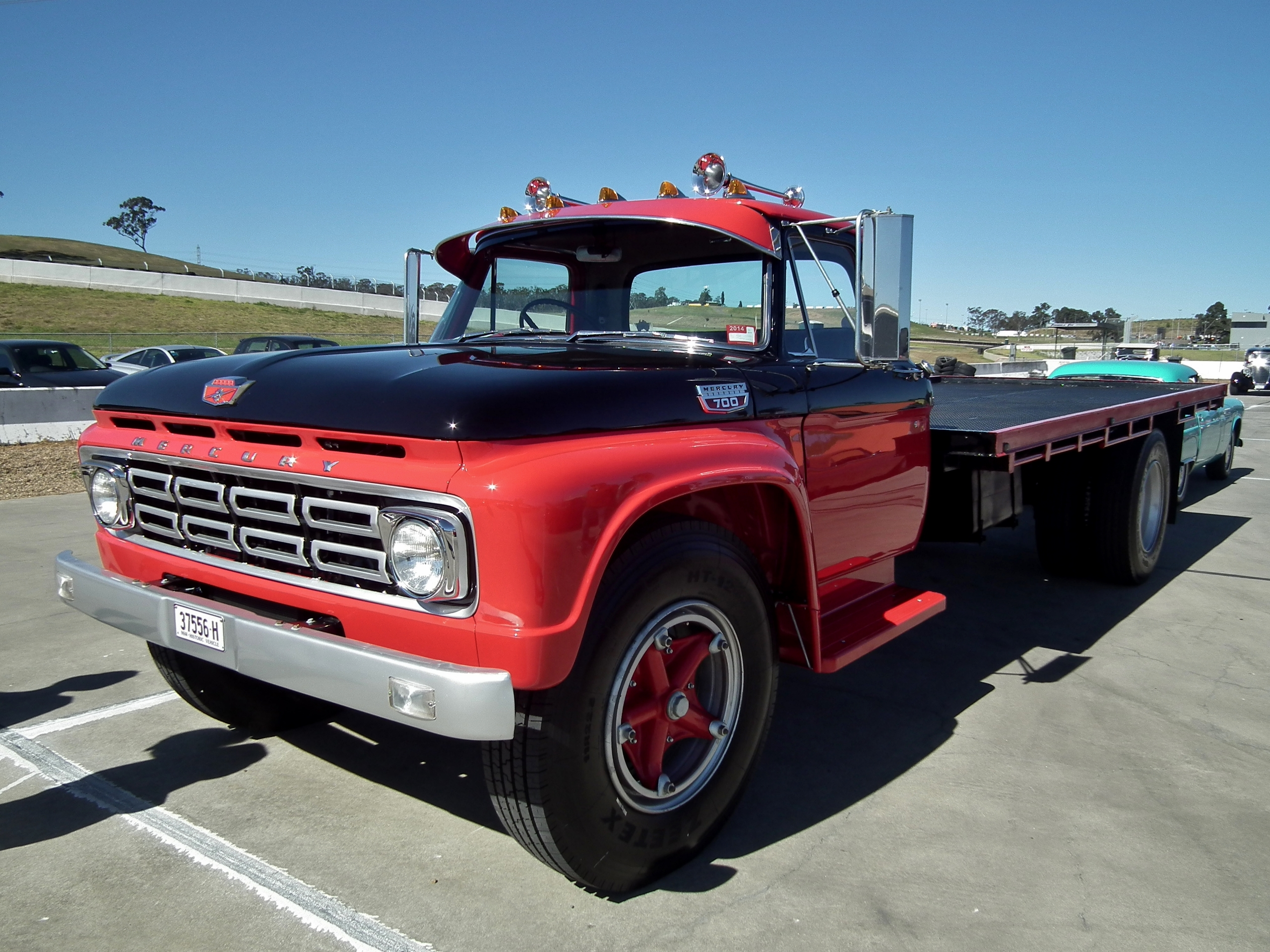
1964 Mercury M700 flatbed towtruck

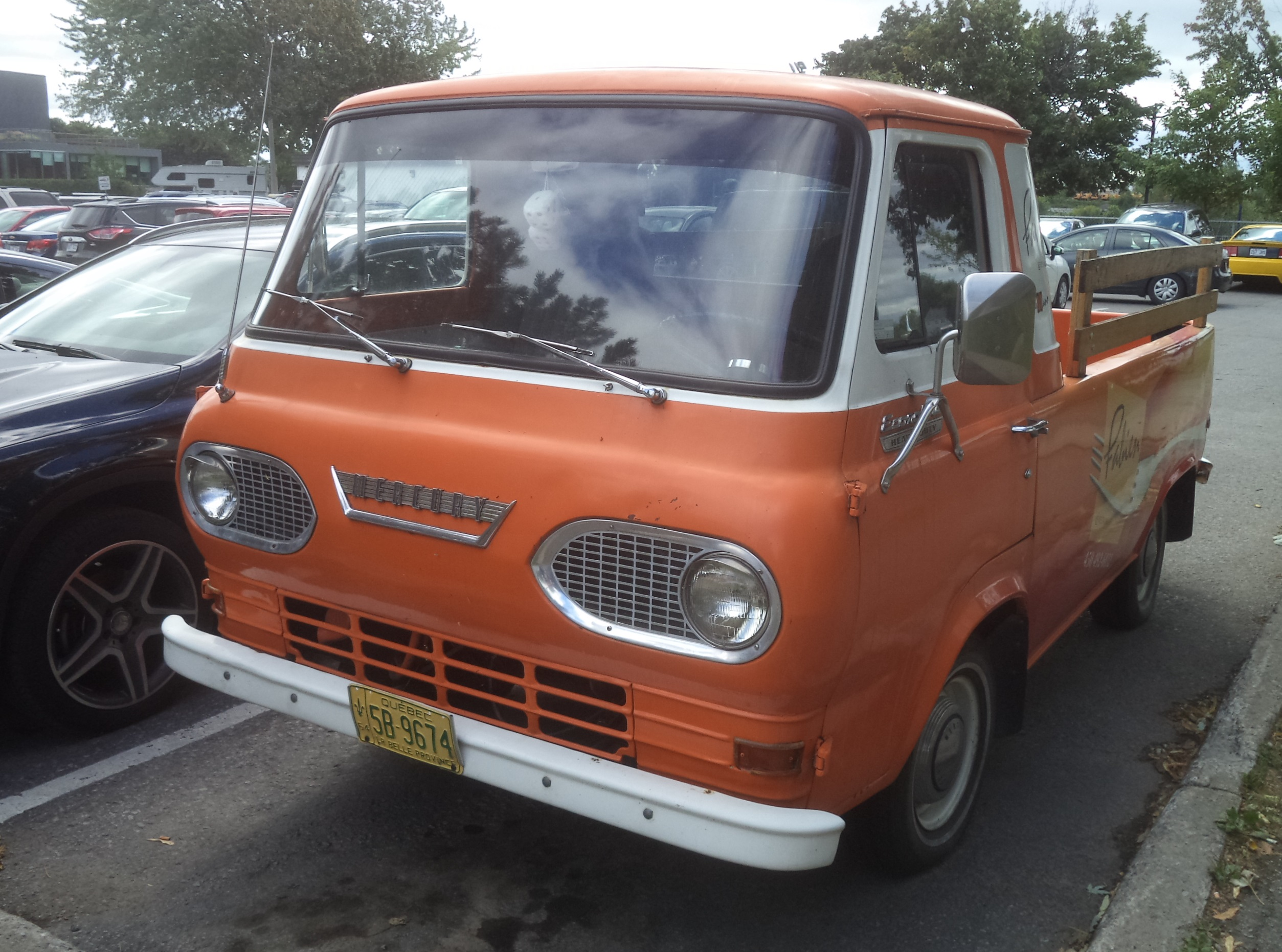
1964 Mercury Econoline EM-100 pickup

Alongside rebranding the F-Series pickup trucks as the M-series, Lincoln-Mercury also marketed other vehicles of the Ford truck range. The Ford medium-duty F-series (F-500 and above) was part of the M-series, including an MB-series bus chassis (Ford B-series). As part of its commercial truck range, Lincoln-Mercury also marketed the Ford C-series tilt-cab truck as an M-series; produced until 1968.

The first-generation Ford Econoline was marketed in Canada as the Mercury Econoline EM-series, sharing both van and pickup truck body configurations. As Mercury-brand light-truck production ended during the 1968 model year, there was no Mercury version of the second-generation Econoline (which was moved to the 1969 model year).

While not sold as a Mercury, the Lincoln-Mercury division also marketed the first-generation (1957-1959) Ford Ranchero through its Meteor brand in Canada.

== Discontinuation ==
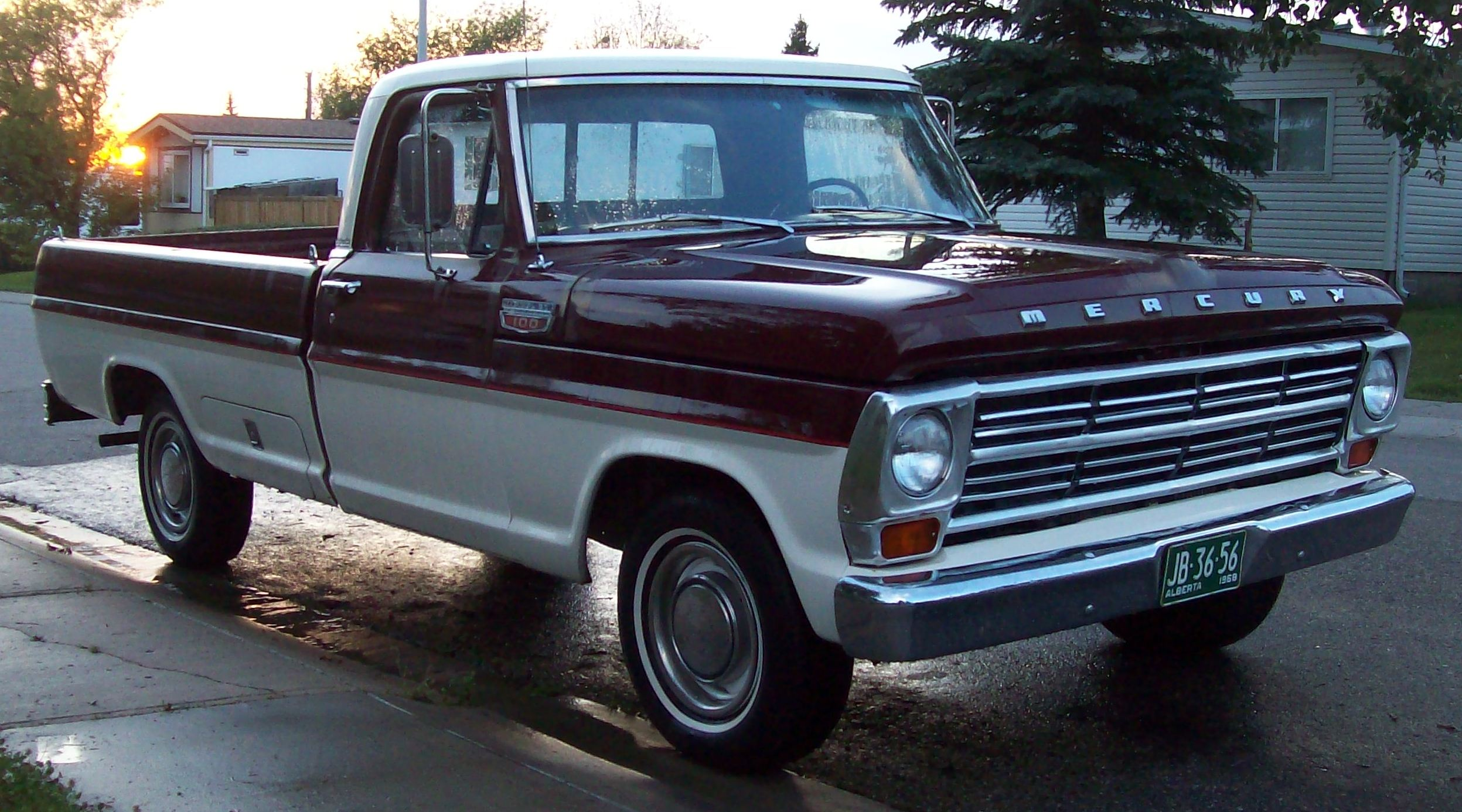
1968 Mercury M100, final year of production

When the Auto-Pact was signed in 1965, opening the border to tariff-free movement of vehicles produced on both sides of the border, Mercury truck production was split between the Oakville, Ontario, plant and the San Jose, California, plant. This enabled Oakville to ramp up production to supply the eastern US and Canada with Ford trucks. No Mercury trucks were sold in the US.

Ford wound down production of the Mercury trucks in the late spring of 1968; documented Mercury trucks have been found built as late as May 15, 1968. Employees of Ford in this time period have reported leftover Mercury M series being converted to Ford trucks. However, no paperwork or confirmation has yet surfaced regarding the final disposition of these, nor of an official end date to production.

After its discontinuation, the next Mercury light truck would be the 1993 Mercury Villager minivan.

== See also ==
- Ford F-Series
- Mercury (automobile)
- Frontenac
- Meteor
- Monarch
