= Ford Y-block engine =

Ford Y-block V8
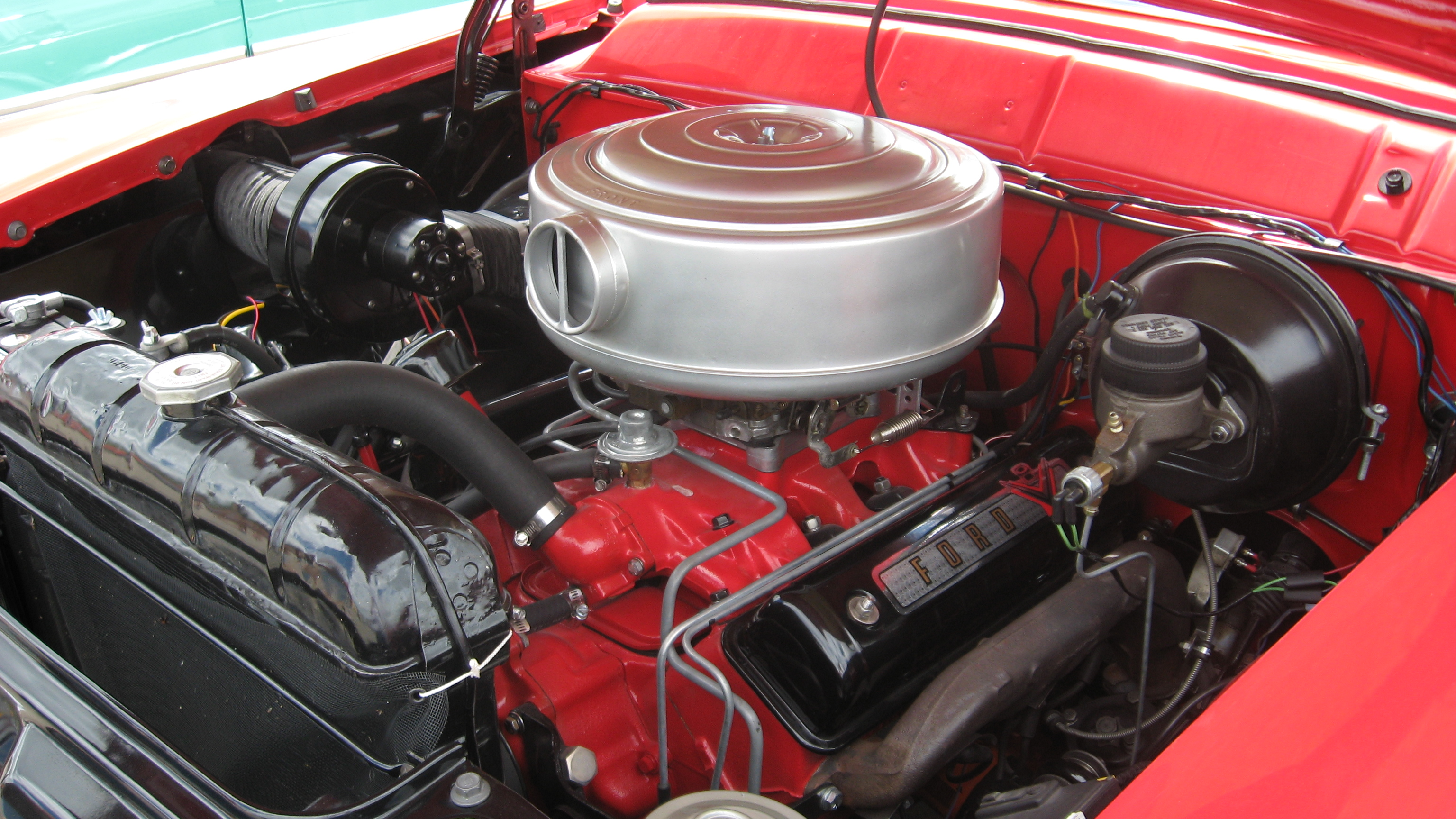

Overview
- Manufacturer: Ford Motor Company
- Production: 1954-1964,1980 South America

Layout
- Configuration: Small-block OHV V8

Chronology
- Predecessor: Flathead V8
- Successor: Ford FE engine Ford Small Block

The Y-block engine is a family of small block overhead valve V8 automobile engines produced by Ford Motor Company. The engine is well known and named for its deep skirting, which causes the engine block to resemble a Y. It was introduced in 1954 as a more modern replacement for the outdated side-valved Ford Flathead V8 and was used in a variety of Ford vehicles through 1964.

== Development ==
By 1948, the famous Ford Flathead V8 had been developed about as far as it could go, and it was antiquated by the early 1950s. Ford was the most conservative of the major automakers, holding onto older designs longer than GM or Chrysler, but market forces pushed Ford to develop new designs in the 1950s. Management at Ford instructed its engineers to develop a new engine for the future. By 1952, Ford had new, 215 cu in (3.5 L) OHV 6-cylinder engine and Lincoln had a 317 cu in (5.2 L) OHV V8. The company had designed the Y-block for a 1953 introduction, but a shortage of nickel due to the Korean War's needs prevented the company from manufacturing the engine in sufficient quantities, delaying it until 1954.

In 1954 the Y-block displaced 239 cu in (3,910 cc), the same as the old Ford Flathead V8 but with a bigger bore and a shorter stroke. It produced 130 bhp (97 kW) as opposed to the Flathead's final 110 bhp (82 kW), an increase of 18%. The Mercury Y-Block was 256 cu in (4,194 cc) and produced 161 bhp (120 kW), again a similar displacement to the 255 cu in (4.2 L) Mercury Flathead V8 it replaced, but with 29% more power than the older engine's 125 bhp (93 kW).

The original Lincoln V8 was also known as a Y-Block. Lincoln introduced their engine in 1952, but it was a different design from the Ford Y-Block, and was used on large cars and Ford heavy-duty trucks.

One of the design qualities of the Y-Block V8 is its deep skirting which makes for a very rigid block for added strength in the bottom end. The drawback to this is it also makes for a heavy cylinder block. This being Ford's first OHV engine, they had to feed oil to the rocker arm shafts through a passage from the center cam bearing. Because of the low detergents in oils of that era these passages would often become clogged giving the Y-Block a reputation for bad oiling to the top end. Ford came up with a stop gap measure for this problem by feeding oil via an external tube directly to the rocker shafts from the main oil gallery.

Cylinder heads on the Y-Block have always been a point for discussion. Because of the configuration of the intake ports, vertically in pairs instead of horizontally side by side, and the way in which they make sharp turns around the head bolts, they have been called “bad breathers”. Although their flow can indeed be inferior, they are nonetheless able to rev to 7,000+ rpm.

Ford Y-blocks are easily identified. The distributor is located at the back of the engine and off to one side and the valve covers are held on with two studs/washers/nuts through the domed tops.

== 239 ==
The first Y-block on Ford automobiles and F100 trucks was the 239 cu in (3,910 cc) version as released in 1954 with EBU casting numbers. The Y-block was the same displacement as the old Ford Flathead V8 that it replaced but with a bigger bore and a shorter stroke (3.5 x 3.1 in). It produced 130 bhp (97 kW) at 4,200 rpm as opposed to the flathead's final 110 bhp (82 kW) at 3,800 rpm, an increase of 18%. Torque was also up compared to the Flathead, with 214 lb⋅ft (290 N⋅m) at 1,800 rpm compared with 196 lb⋅ft (266 N⋅m) at 2,000 rpm. The Y-block was considered a major advancement over the flathead. The 239 was available in 1954 models (EBU casting numbers), and in late 1954 and 1955 (EBV casting numbers), while also in 1955 the bigger 272 and 292 cubic inch siblings were introduced. The 1955 EBV 239 engine exchanges many parts with later model Y-blocks such as the 272 and 292, while the 1954 EBU engine has many parts that do not exchange with the 1955 EBV 239 and later Y-blocks.

== 256 ==
The original Mercury Y-block, introduced for the 1954 model year, displaced 256 cu in (4,194 cc). Advertised as the "V-161" engine, it ran a bore and stroke of 3.625 x 3.1 in. The compression ratio was 7.5:1, and the rated power was 161 hp (120 kW) at 4,400 rpm. Torque was 238 lb⋅ft (323 N⋅m) at 2,200 rpm. The engine breathed through a Holley model 2140 (4V) carburetor. The 256 version of the Mercury Y-block was only available in 1954 models and was replaced by the 292 in 1955. The 256 was also used in some F100s in 1955 depending on the production plant location and was also installed in law enforcement sedans.

== 272 ==
By 1955 Chevrolet introduced its small block V8 with 265 cu in (4.3 L); not to be outdone, Ford increased its displacement to 272 cu in (4.5 L) and introduced the Thunderbird with a 292 cu in (4.8 L) engine. The 272 cu in (4,465 cc) version of the Y-Block was the same bore as the outgoing Mercury 256 cubic inch Y-Block but with a longer stroke (3.625 x 3.3 in). The standard 1955 U-code featured a two barrel Holley carburetor and was rated at 162 bhp (121 kW) at 4,400 rpm and 258 lb⋅ft (350 N⋅m) at 2,400 rpm. The optional "Power Pack" M-code used a four barrel Holley carburetor and was rated at 182 bhp (136 kW) at 4,400 rpm.

In 1956 the U-code was updated to produce 173 bhp (129 kW) at 4,400 rpm and 260 lb⋅ft (353 N⋅m) at 2,400 rpm with a manual transmission behind it or 176 bhp (131 kW) at 4,400 rpm and 264 lb⋅ft (358 N⋅m) at 2,400 rpm with an automatic transmission. The M-code 272 was dropped altogether in 1956 in favour of a four barrel M-code version of the 292.

A final version of the 272 in the US was released in 1957 as the B-code. It featured a two barrel Holley carburetor and was rated at 190 bhp (142 kW) at 4,500 rpm and 270 lb⋅ft (366 N⋅m) at 2,700 rpm.

Ford Australia released this V8 motor as its only option in the four-door Customline sedan from 1955 to 1959 (based on the Canadian Meteor), and its coupé utility, based on the same styling as the Customline, called a Mainline. It was introduced in passenger cars in July 1955, and in the redesigned truck lineup one month later. In late 1956 the Australian 272 switched to a four bolt 2 barrel Autolite carburetor.

This engine, as well as the 292 version starting in 1956, was also produced by Ford of Brazil at its São Paulo plant facility (Ipiranga plant). A new building was opened on November 21, 1958, by the Brazilian President, Juscelino Kubitschek de Oliveira, to produce the first Ford engine in South America. The 272 version was used on Brazilian F-series trucks until 1977 and on the Brazilian Galaxie 500, launched in April 1967.

== 292 ==
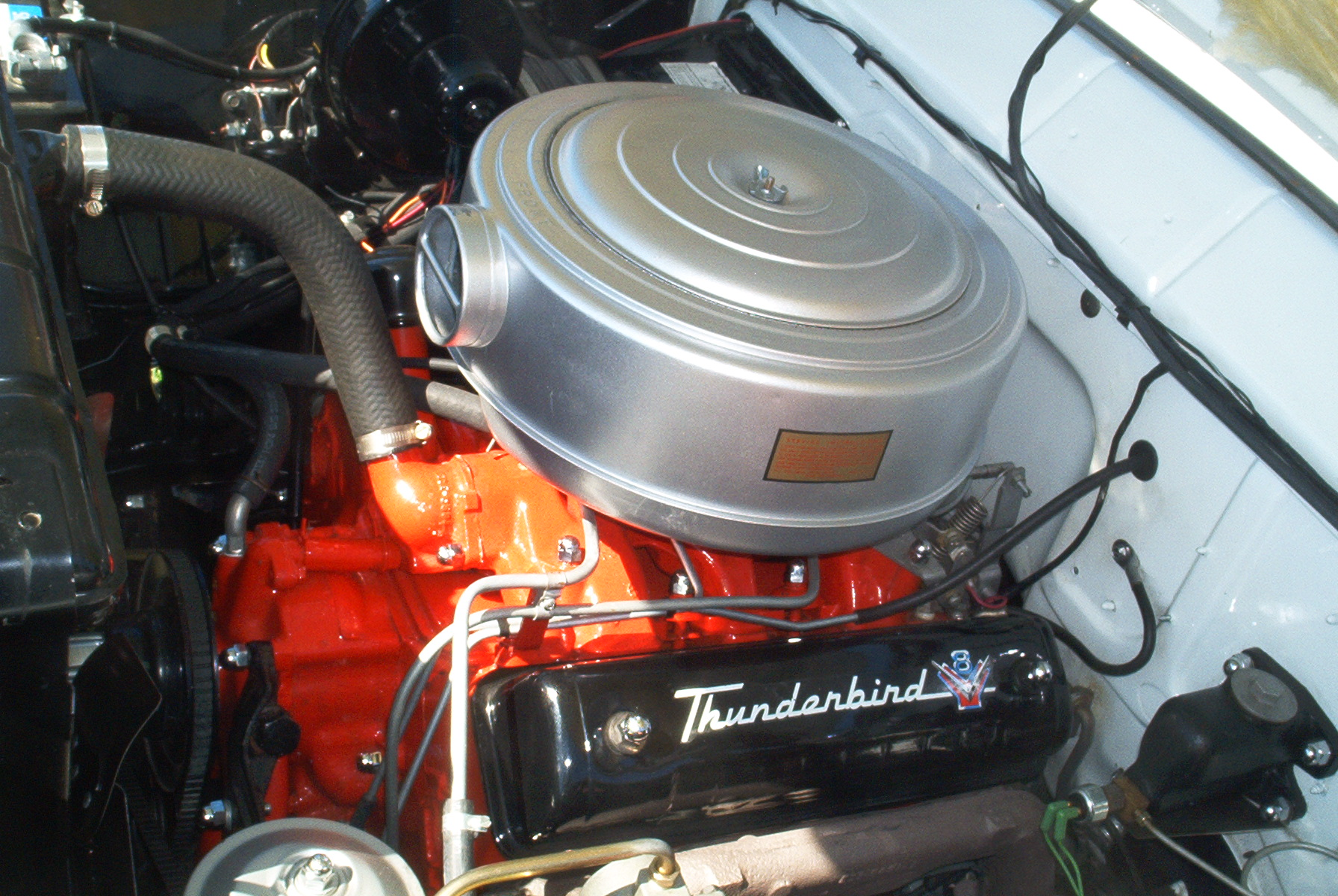
A 292 Y-block engine in a 1955 Ford Crown Victoria Skyliner

The 292 cu in (4,778 cc) Y-Block was also introduced in 1955. The 292 shared the 3.3 in (83.82 mm) stroke of the 272 but with a larger 3.75 in (95.25 mm) bore. It was used in the Ford Thunderbird, 1959-60 Edsel, Mercury, and some high-end Ford cars. The Ford version was the P-code "Thunderbird V8", which for cars equipped with a manual transmission had a compression ratio of 8.1:1 and was rated at 193 bhp (144 kW) at 4,400 rpm and with 280 lb⋅ft (380 N⋅m) at 2,600 rpm. Cars equipped with an automatic transmission had a slightly higher compression ratio of 8.5:1 with a quoted 198 bhp (148 kW) at 4,400 rpm and 286 lb⋅ft (388 N⋅m) at 2,500 rpm.

The Mercury division had two versions of the 292 available in 1955. The standard engine had a 7.6:1 compression ratio and was rated at 188 bhp (140 kW) at 4,400 rpm, with 272 lb⋅ft (369 N⋅m) of torque at 2,500 rpm. The top of the range Montclair V8 came with a higher specification version that was rated 198 bhp (148 kW) at 4,400 rpm and 282 lb⋅ft (382 N⋅m) at 2,500 rpm. 1955 would be the only model year that Mercury would use the 292 in version of the Y-Block, with it being replaced by the larger 312 in engine for the 1956 model year.

In 1956 Ford replaced the P-code 292 with a new 312 cu in (5.1 L) "Thunderbird Special V8" version of the Y-Block, while the M-code 272 was replaced with a new M-Code specification of the 292. This M-code "Thunderbird V8" 292 was now optional on all Fords. The engine when fitted with a manual transmission vehicle had an 8.0:1 compression ratio and was rated at 200 bhp (149 kW) at 4,600 rpm and 285 lb⋅ft (386 N⋅m) at 2,600 rpm, whilst the automatic featured an 8.4:1 compression ratio with a rating of 202 bhp (151 kW) at 4,600 rpm and 289 lb⋅ft (392 N⋅m) at 2,600 rpm.

All Ford Y-Blocks were up on power for the 1957 model year. The 292 was available as the C-code engine option, once again with a slight difference between the manual transmission and "Fordomatic" automatic transmission. Compression was up to 9.1:1 in manual cars, which were rated 206 bhp (154 kW) at 4,500 rpm and 297 lb⋅ft (403 N⋅m) at 2,700 rpm. Automatic vehicles were rated 212 bhp (158 kW) at 4,500 rpm, torque and compression ratio are not listed in the Ford 1957 workshop manual as being any different from the manual car, which seems unlikely given the power difference at the same engine speed.

The 292 would be the longest-lived of the Y-Blocks, carrying on until 1962 in U.S. cars and until 1964 in U.S. trucks. It was also used in Argentina in the F-100 pick-up well into the 1960s, and was known as Fase I (Phase I). In 1971, the engine was modified to accept a new-style cylinder head with a different valve arrangement (E-I-E-I-E-I-E-I versus E-I-I-E-E-I-I-E), new intake and exhaust manifolds and was renamed Fase II (Phase II). In this form, the 292 Fase II continued into the 1980s in the F-100, and was also used in the Argentine Ford Fairlane (built from 1969 to 1982, and based heavily on the U.S. 1968 model). All Argentine versions of this engine feature a cast crankshaft rather than the forged example that equipped US heavy-duty engines. The 292 version was also produced by Ford of Brazil and equipped the Brazilian LTD starting in 1969. Both the 272 and 292 engines were replaced on Brazilian cars by the 302 Windsor family engine starting on 1976 model year.

== 312 ==
The 312 cu in (5.1 L) V8 engine came out for the 1956 model year and was again used in high-end Ford and Mercury cars, including the Thunderbird.

Bore x stroke dimensions were 3.80 in × 3.44 in (96.5 mm × 87.4 mm).

Depending on model year and application, the 312 was available with a single two- or four-barrel Holley carburetor, two four-barrel carburetors and with or without a McCulloch (Paxton) supercharger (1957 only).

All 1956 U.S. Mercury models were powered by the 312 cu in (5.1 L) V8 breathing through a four-barrel carburetor. At the beginning of the model year, a 210 hp (213 PS; 157 kW) version with 8.0:1 compression ratio powered Mercury cars with manual transmissions (including three-speed plus overdrive), while a 225 hp (228 PS; 168 kW) version powered cars with automatic transmissions. The 225-horsepower version had an 8.4:1 compression ratio. Later in the model year, a 235 hp (238 PS; 175 kW) version with 9.0:1 compression ratio became available. All 1956 Mercury engines had gold-painted blocks and heads. The 210-horsepower version had red valve covers and air cleaner, while the 225-horsepower version had blue valve covers and air cleaner. The 235-horsepower version had argent silver valve covers and air cleaner. A dealer-installed "M 260" engine kit was released in January 1956. The kit consisted of a hotter camshaft, revised cylinder heads, and an intake manifold mounting two four-barrel carburetors. The kit was advertised as boosting the Mercury 312 V8 to 260 hp (264 PS; 194 kW).

Not generally known, about 40% of these 312s were equipped with vacuum secondary CARTER WCFBs. They are a highly desired version, as the Holleys were cantankerous.

The 312s had no centrifugal timing advance in their distributors until 1957.

The last regular application of the 312 V8 in the U.S. was for certain 1960 Mercury models. Though considered to be a high-performance engine in 1956 and 1957, it was downgraded to an "economy" engine with low compression and two-barrel carburetor by 1960. Ford pickups used the 292 cu in (4.8 L) version as late as 1965.

== Replacement ==
When Ford Y-block debuted its power making ability was already hindered by its inherent displacement limit. A quick reference to the engine specifications for 1955-57 shows the Ford V8s ahead of the Chevrolet counterparts in displacement, horsepower, and torque. However, larger CID V8 engines made by Cadillac, Chrysler, Buick, Pontiac and Oldsmobile clearly showed the small CID architecture of the Y-block would need revision in order to keep pace with the other automakers.

Even with the benefit of today's technology (aftermarket rods and stroker cranks), the upper limit of a Y-block is about 348 cu in (5.7 L), while the Chevrolet could be modified well past the factory limit of 400 cu in (6.6 L). The result was the introduction in 1958 of the 332 CID "big block" Ford FE engine which ultimately grew to 428 cu in. Later, in 1962, the Ford Windsor engine – which began at 221 cu in (3.6 L) would fully replace the Y-Block and grow to 351 cu in (5.8 L).
