= Ford F-Series (first generation) =

First generation of the Ford F-Series pickup trucks

First generation
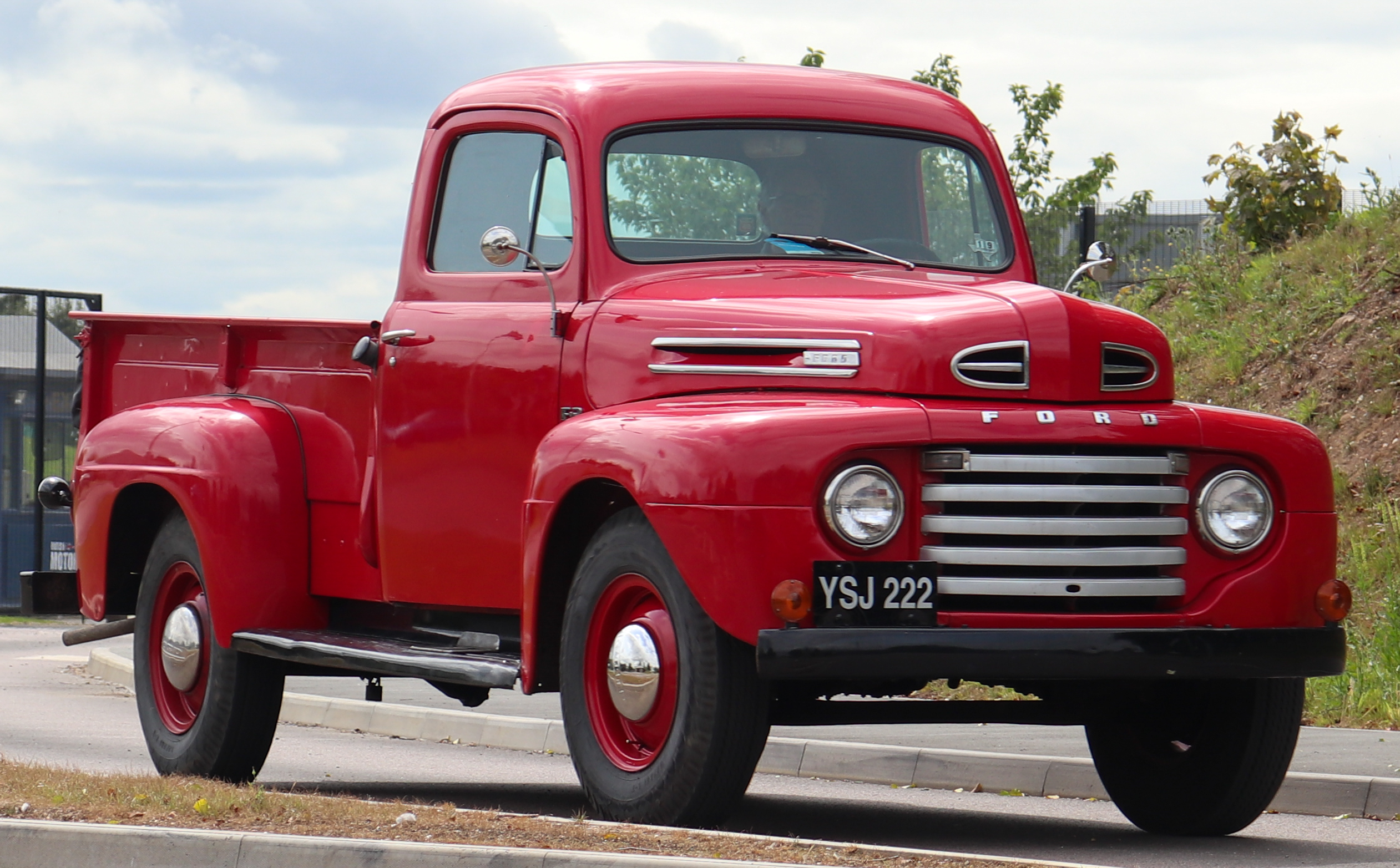
- 1949 Ford F-3

Overview
- Manufacturer: Ford Motor Company
- Also called: Ford Bonus-Built
- Production: November 27, 1947 – 1952
- Model years: 1948–1952
- Assembly: United States: Chester, Pennsylvania; Dallas, Texas; Dearborn, Michigan; Edison, New Jersey; Hapeville, Georgia; Highland Park, Michigan; Long Beach, California; Norfolk, Virginia; St. Louis, Missouri; St. Paul, Minnesota

Body and chassis
- Class: Full-size pickup truck
- Body style: 2-door pickup 4-door panel truck
- Layout: Front engine, rear-wheel drive / four-wheel drive
- Related: Mercury M-Series (1948–1952)

Powertrain
- Engine: 226 cu in (3.7 L) I6; 239 cu in (3.9 L) Flathead V8; 254 cu in (4.2 L) I6; 337 cu in (5.5 L) Flathead V8; 215 cu in (3.5 L) I6; 279 cu in (4.6 L) Y-block V8; 317 cu in (5.2 L) Y-block V8
- Transmission: 3-speed manual 4-speed manual 5-speed manual

Chronology
- Predecessor: Ford pickup (1942–1947)
- Successor: Ford F-Series (second generation) (1953–1956)

The first generation of the Ford F-Series (also known as the Ford Bonus-Built trucks) is a series of trucks that was produced by Ford Motor Company from the 1948 to the 1952 model years. The introduction of the F-Series marked the divergence of Ford car and truck design, developing a chassis intended specifically for truck use. Alongside pickup trucks, the model line included also panel vans, bare and cowled chassis, and marked Ford's entry into the medium- and heavy-duty truck segment.

From 1947 to 1952, Ford assembled F-Series trucks at 16 facilities across North America. In Canada, the model line was also marketed through Lincoln-Mercury as the Mercury M-Series to expand dealership coverage in rural areas. This generation of F-Series pickup trucks is the only generation to use entirely flathead engines (inline-6 and V8s).

== Development & Design ==
After World War II, Ford's war-time effort toward producing B-24 bombers, jeeps, tank engines, and other military hardware ended. When civilian passenger cars and trucks were put back into production, Ford produced the same truck and car design since 1941. After the 1947 model year was introduced, a completely new design was planned, which could appeal to various applications, extending further than just having a single purpose.

The development objective included making the driving easier, with comfortable and roomier cab, and a great customer appreciation. When introduced, Ford's new truck would be the only truck featuring an all-new post-war design. GM's Advance Design trucks featured an all-new body, but was based on a pre-war A platform which were at the time shared with other GM passenger cars. Dodge's B series, although fully redesigned, retained an outdated semicircular rear wheel well design. Ford departed from sharing a common platform with its passenger lineup and developed a purpose-built truck frame specifically for the F-Series. The new frame included a third cross-member which enabled extra strength enough to be shared with its medium-duty lineup. Also, Ford was the only company to offer V8 engines for both pickup trucks and medium-duty trucks until 1954. To better absorb rough uneven roads, and to reduce maintenance costs, Ford was also the first to introduce telescopic double-acting shock absorbers to the pickup truck market in place of the lever shocks and were advertised as the "Aircraft Type Shocks."

Ford also spent $1 million on research and tooling for the new cab, which was dubbed the "Million-Dollar Cab." Compared to the previous model of Ford trucks, the new cab was seven inches wider and provided extra headroom. It also included wider doors that were moved three inches forward and extended beneath the cab's floor for better accessibility and interior protection from dust, moisture, and drafts. A new flat one-piece windshield was two inches higher than the previous generation, which combined with the larger rear window offered better all-around visibility. The new cab also had increased foot room, and bench seats with adjustable fore, aft, and rake. To improve comfort, the cab was isolated from the frame using bushings at the front and lever-action torsion links in the rear in order to insulate vibration and noise. Ford also added more cushioning to the bench seat, which were wrapped with springs for improved comfort. The front fenders were wider and taller and had a single-piece-like, wrap-around design with integrated headlamps. The five-bar horizontal grille had integrated turn signal lights into the top grille bar. Rear fenders no longer had the teardrop shape; instead, they had more rounded and continuous side body lines. Two openings were added over bold FORD lettering at the nose; the left opening also acted as a hood release handle.

The three-way ventilation system consisted of two vent windows (driver- and passenger-side doors) and an additional vent located at the cowl. Steering effort was reduced with an increased steering ratio. A new channeled steel front bumper was attached directly to the extended frame rails, which provided increased rigidity and a smoother ride.

The new trucks were introduced in late 1947 (going on sale January 16, 1948). Standard features included ashtray, glove box, and driver-side sun visor which was unusual on trucks at the time. Options included the "See-Clear" windshield washer (operated by foot plunger), passenger-side windshield wiper and sun visor, and passenger-side taillight. The F-1 truck was also available with additional stainless steel trim and two horns as an option. All F-Series were available with optional "Marmon-Herrington All Wheel Drive" until 1959.

The design of the F-Series truck changed tremendously from 1950 to 1954. From 1948 to 1950, the grille was a series of horizontal bars and the headlights were set into the fenders. For 1951 and 1952, the headlights were connected by a wide aerodynamic cross piece with three similarly aerodynamic supports. The rear window was wider in these later trucks and the dashboard was redesigned. This new cab was called the "Five-Star Cab."

== Models ==
The first-generation F-Series was marketed in eight different chassis (based on their GVWR), giving them their model names: the F-1 was the lightest-capacity version and F-8 the highest. F-1 through F-3 pickup trucks were offered (forming the basis for panel trucks) and the bare F-3 chassis served as the basis for a parcel delivery truck. The heavier-duty F-4 chassis was produced as a light-duty commercial truck. The F-5 and F-6 were produced as medium-duty trucks in four configurations: a conventional, A special-order heavier duty parcel delivery version (as the P-Series), a COE/cab-over (as the C-Series), and a school-bus chassis (as the B-Series, with no bodywork aft of the firewall). The F-7 and F-8 were heavy-duty commercial trucks, marketed under the "Big Job" brand name from 1951.

With the exception of bus chassis and parcel-delivery vehicles (which used bodywork produced by second-party manufacturers), Ford shared the same cab design on all F-Series trucks; C-Series trucks moved the cab upward and forward, requiring a higher hood and different fenders than conventional models. Also, F-2 and up used larger wheel well openings than the F-1 models.

The most common first-generation model was the F-1 with a 6.5-foot (2.0 m) bed with 45 cubic feet volume of cargo capacity and 114-inch (290 cm) wheelbase, followed by the F-2 and F-3 Express models with an 8-foot (2.4 m) bed with 122-inch (310 cm) and a single side member located each side over the wheel housing. All pickup truck beds used an all-steel floor construction with hardwood subfloor to keep it from being dented. Skid strips were now stamped into the steel, so they would not come loose, unlike the previous model. The tailgate was strengthened and reinforced using a rolled edge with a tapered truss. Anti-rattle chains had a smooth, quiet operation and lengthened to allow the tailgate to open flat to the bed floor, allowing easier loading and unloading of the cargo by sliding.

1948-1952 Ford F-Series (Bonus-Built) model range
Model	Description	GVWR	Body Style(s)	Length	Width	Height	Wheelbase
F-1	½ ton	4,700 lb (2,132 kg)	Pickup truck Panel truck	188.8 in (4,796 mm)	75.94 in (1,929 mm)	75.63 in (1,921 mm)	114 in (2,896 mm)
F-2	¾ ton	5,700 lb (2,585 kg)	Pickup truck Panel truck	206.96 in (5,257 mm)	75.94 in (1,929 mm)	61.56 in (1,564 mm)	122 in (3,099 mm)
F-3	¾ ton (heavy duty)	6,800 lb (3,084 kg) 7,000 lb (3,175 kg) (parcel delivery) 7,800 lb (3,538 kg) (optional rear springs)	Pickup truck Panel truck Parcel delivery truck	210.5 in (5,347 mm)	75.94 in (1,929 mm)	75.63 in (1,921 mm)	122 in (3,099 mm)
F-4	1 ton 1¼ ton (optional)	7,500 lb (3,402 kg) 10,000 lb (4,536 kg)	Conventional (light-duty)	216 in (5,486 mm)	75.94 in (1,929 mm)	75.63 in (1,921 mm)	122 in (3,099 mm)
F-5	1½ ton	9,000–14,000 lb (4,082–6,350 kg)	Parcel (P-series)(Special Order)	220 in (5,588 mm)	77.5 in (1,968 mm)	75.63 in (1,921 mm)	135 in (3,429 mm)
F-5	1½ ton	10,000–14,500 lb (4,536–6,577 kg)	COE (C-Series) Bus chassis (B-Series) Conventional (medium-duty)	246 in (6,248 mm)	80 in (2,032 mm)	80 in (2,032 mm)	135 in (3,429 mm)
F-6	2 ton	14,000–16,000 lb (6,350–7,257 kg)	COE (C-Series) Bus chassis (B-Series) Conventional (medium-duty)	246 in (6,248 mm)	80 in (2,032 mm)	80 in (2,032 mm)	135 in (3,429 mm)
F-7	"Big Job"	17,000–19,000 lb (7,711–8,618 kg)	Conventional (heavy-duty)	246 in (6,248 mm)	80 in (2,032 mm)	80 in (2,032 mm)	135 in (3,429 mm)
F-8	"Big Job"	20,000–22,000 lb (9,072–9,979 kg)	Conventional (heavy-duty)	276 in (7,000 mm)	82.5 in (2,096 mm)	81 in (2,057 mm)	135 in (3,429 mm)

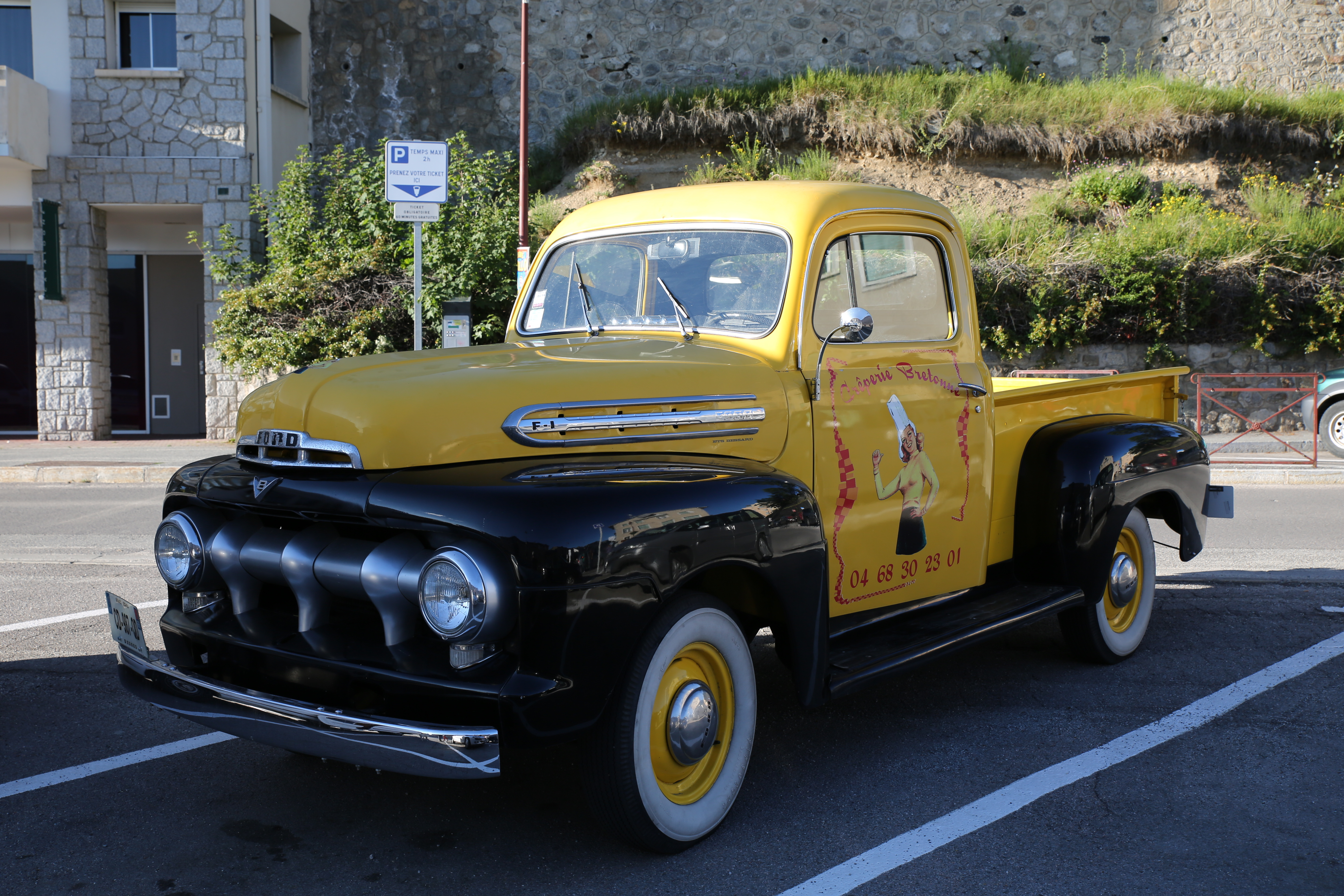
F-1 pickup

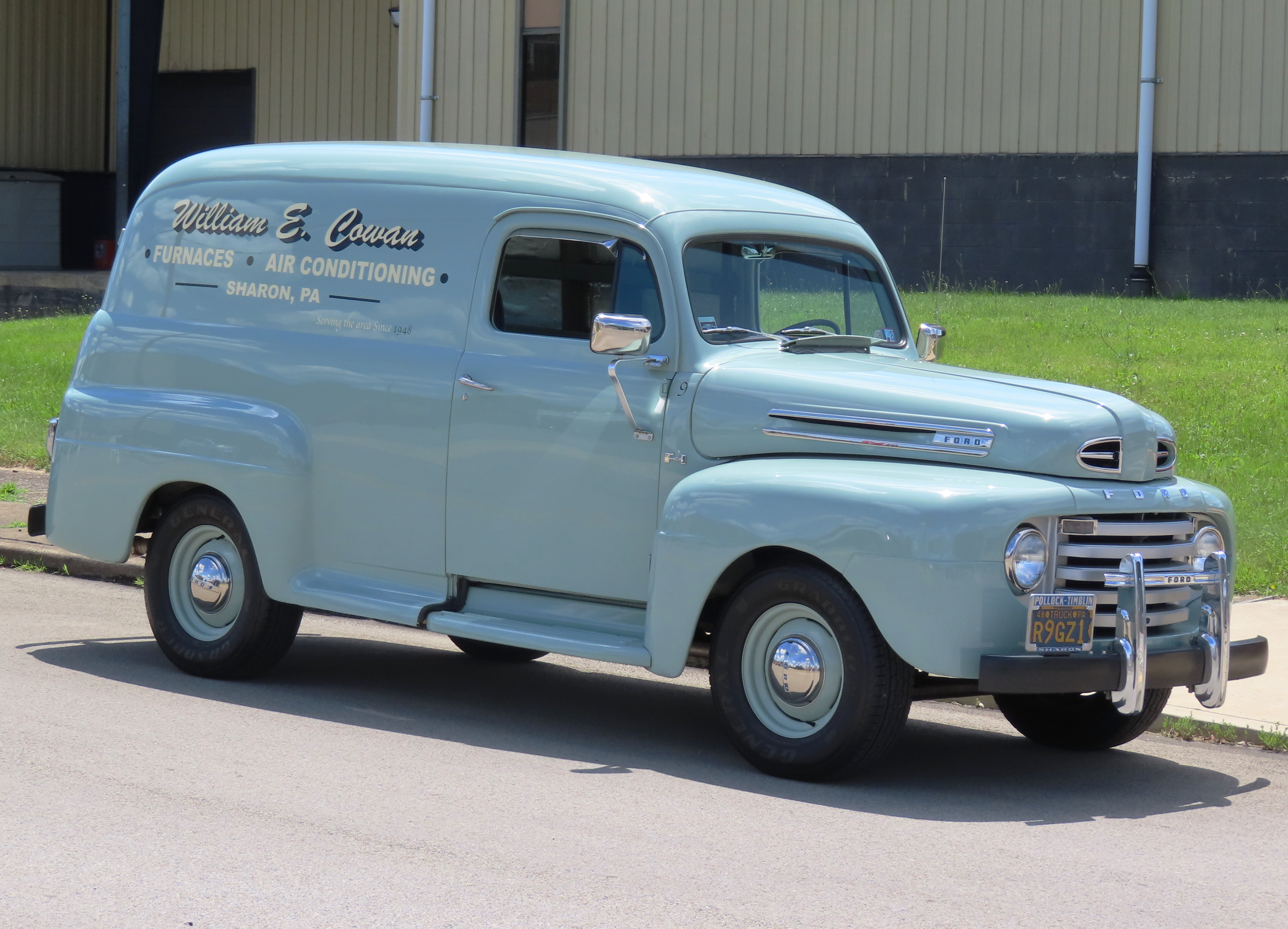
F-1 panel van

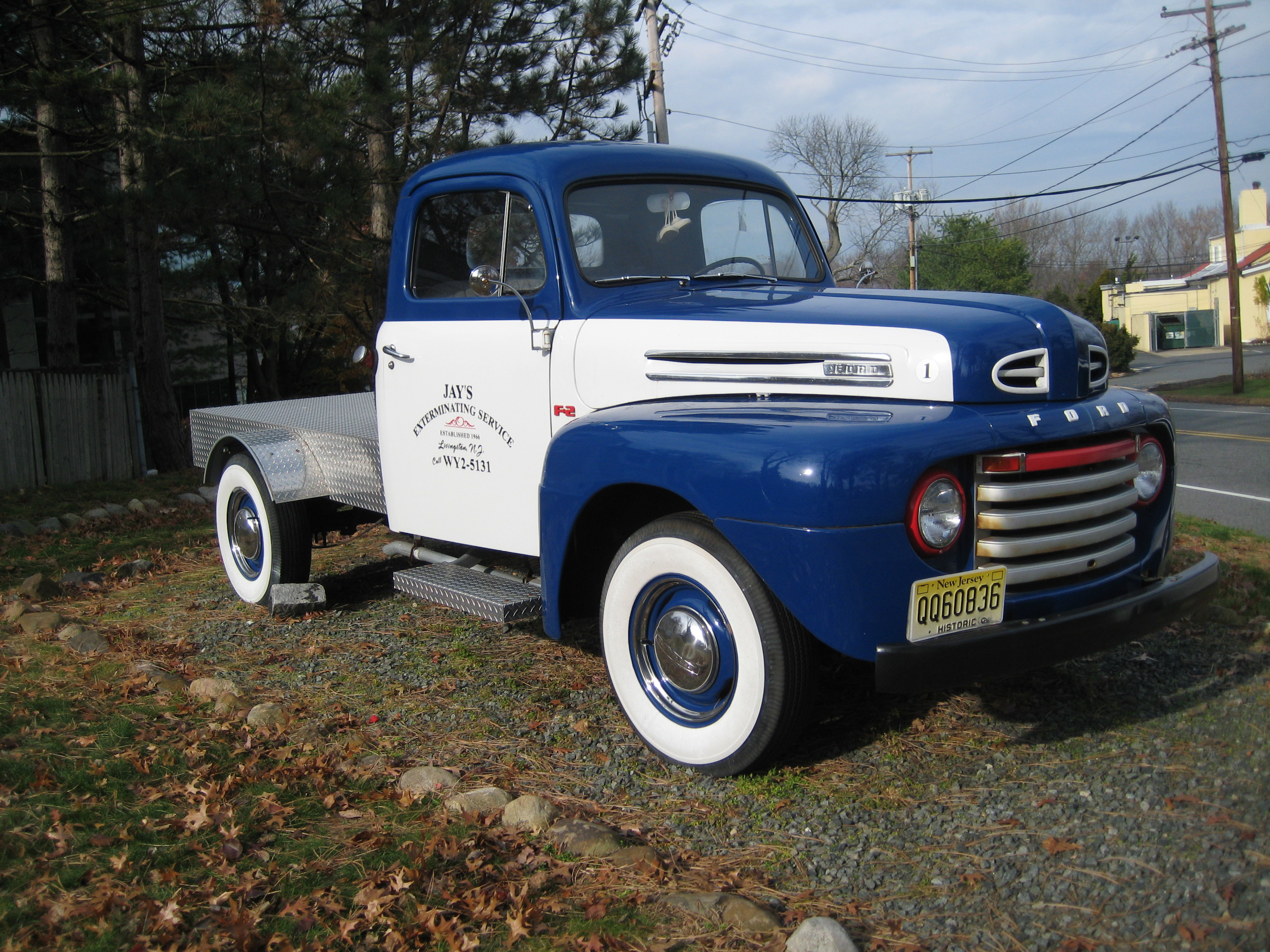
F-2 (converted to flatbed)

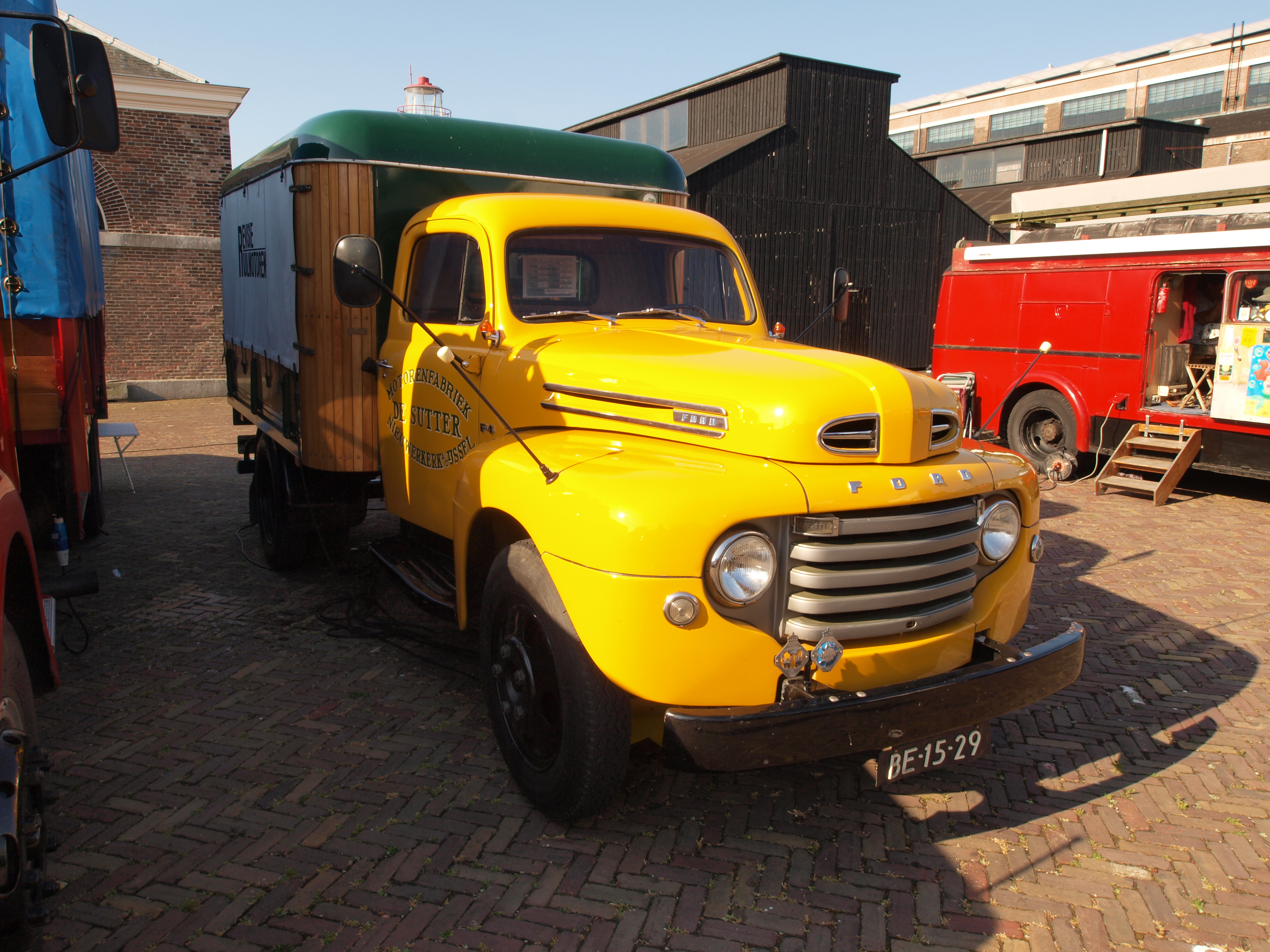
F-4 truck

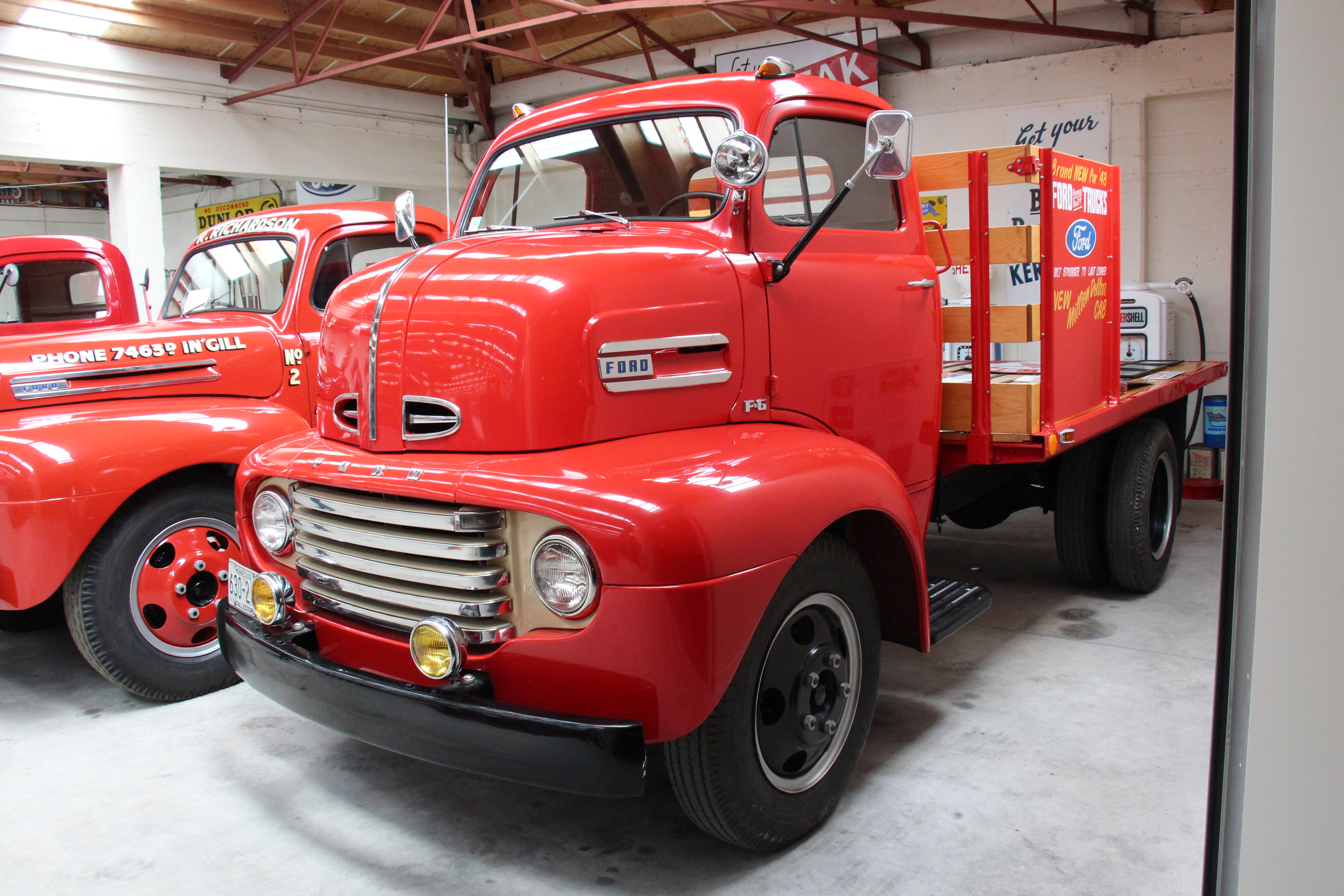
C-6 COE flatbed

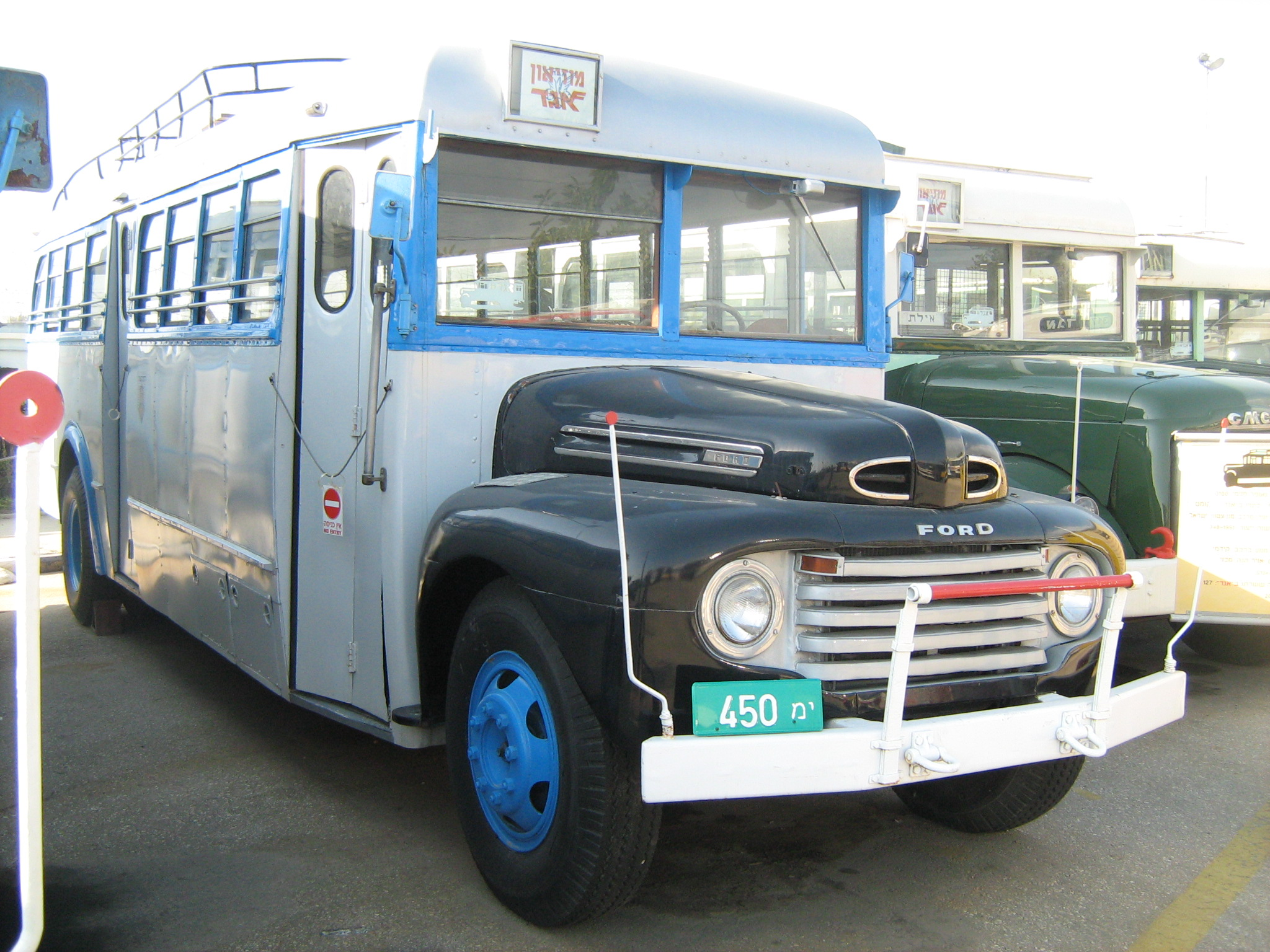
B-6 (bus chassis)

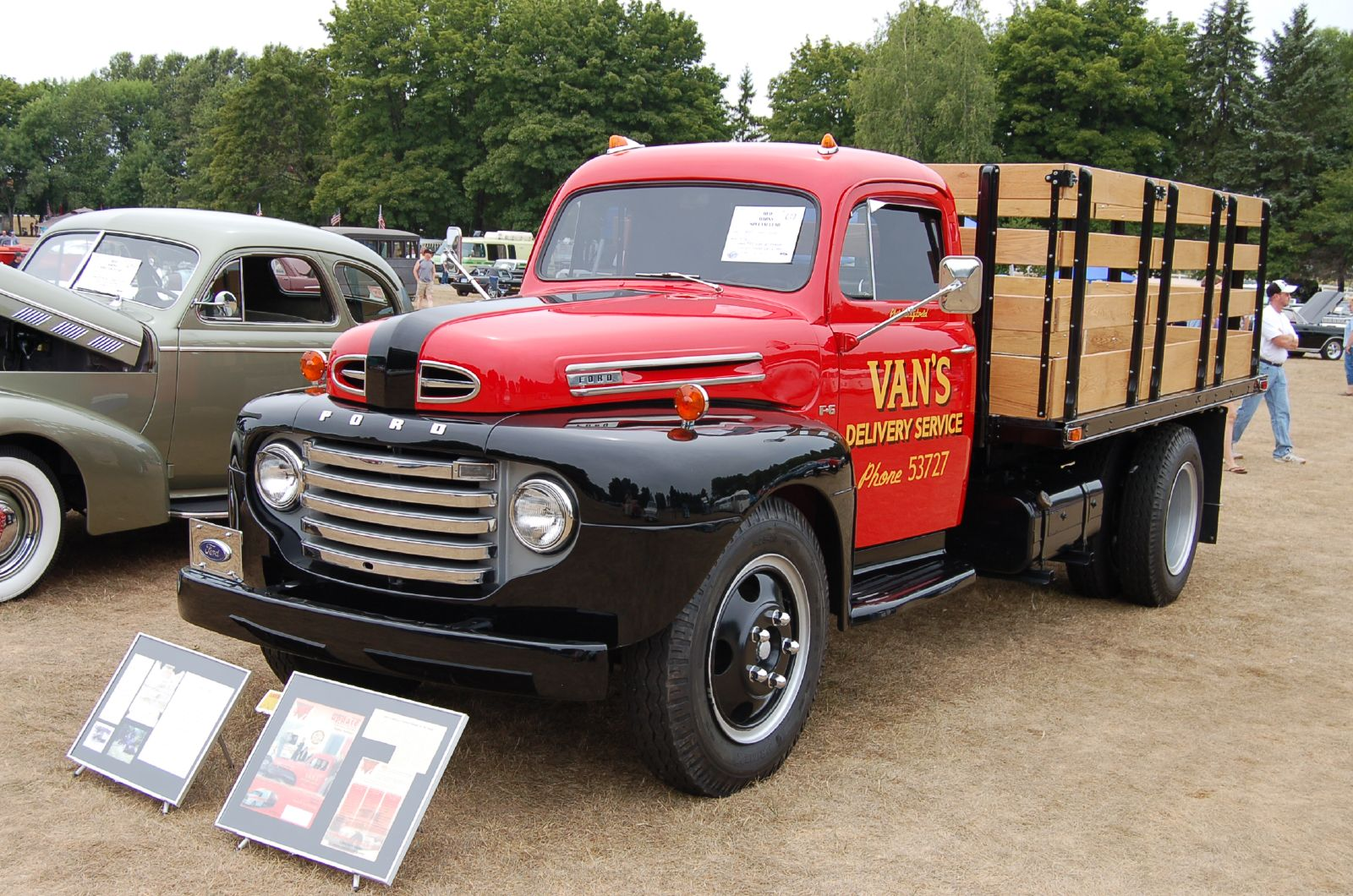
F-6 stake truck

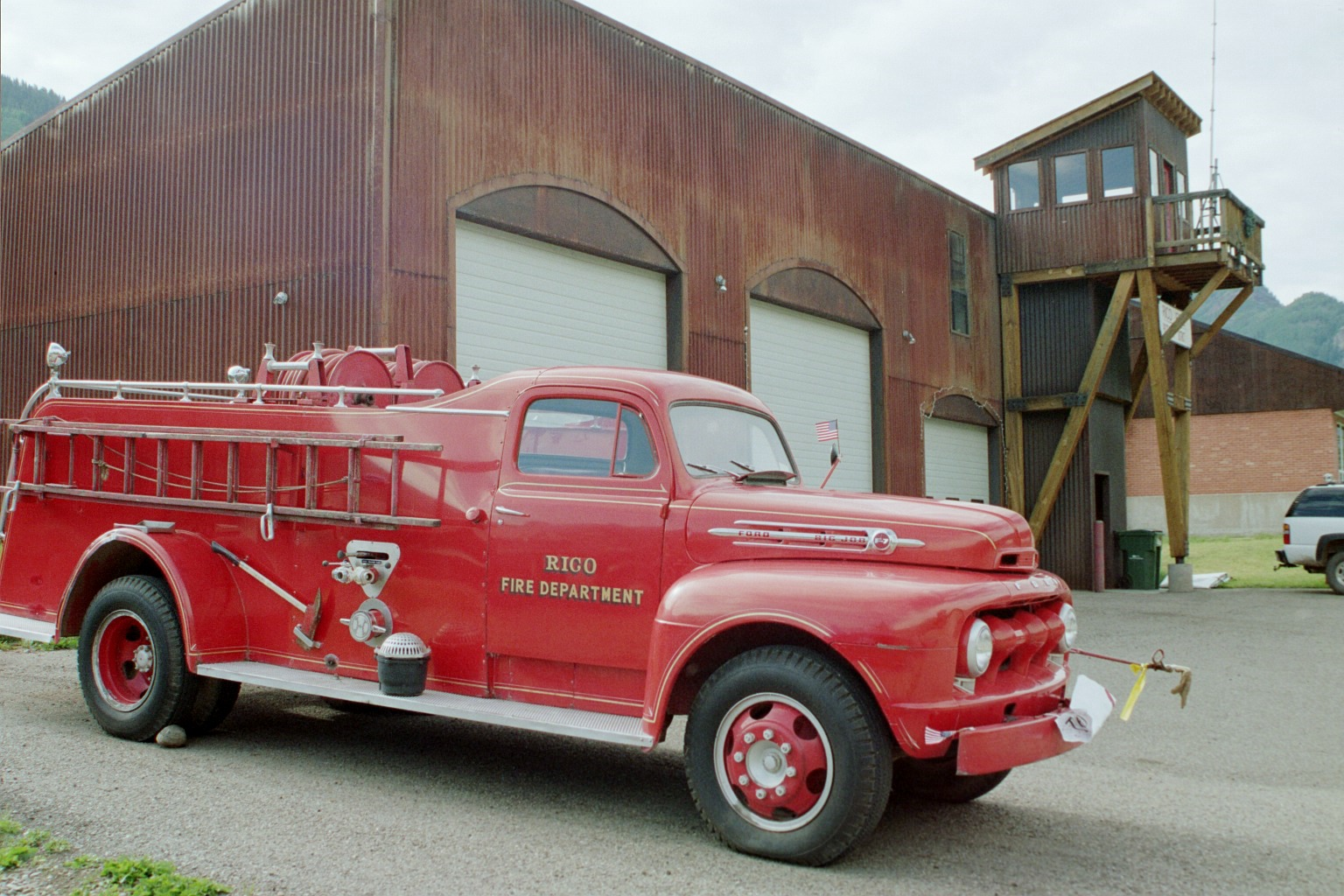
F-7 Big Job fire truck

=== Yearly changes ===
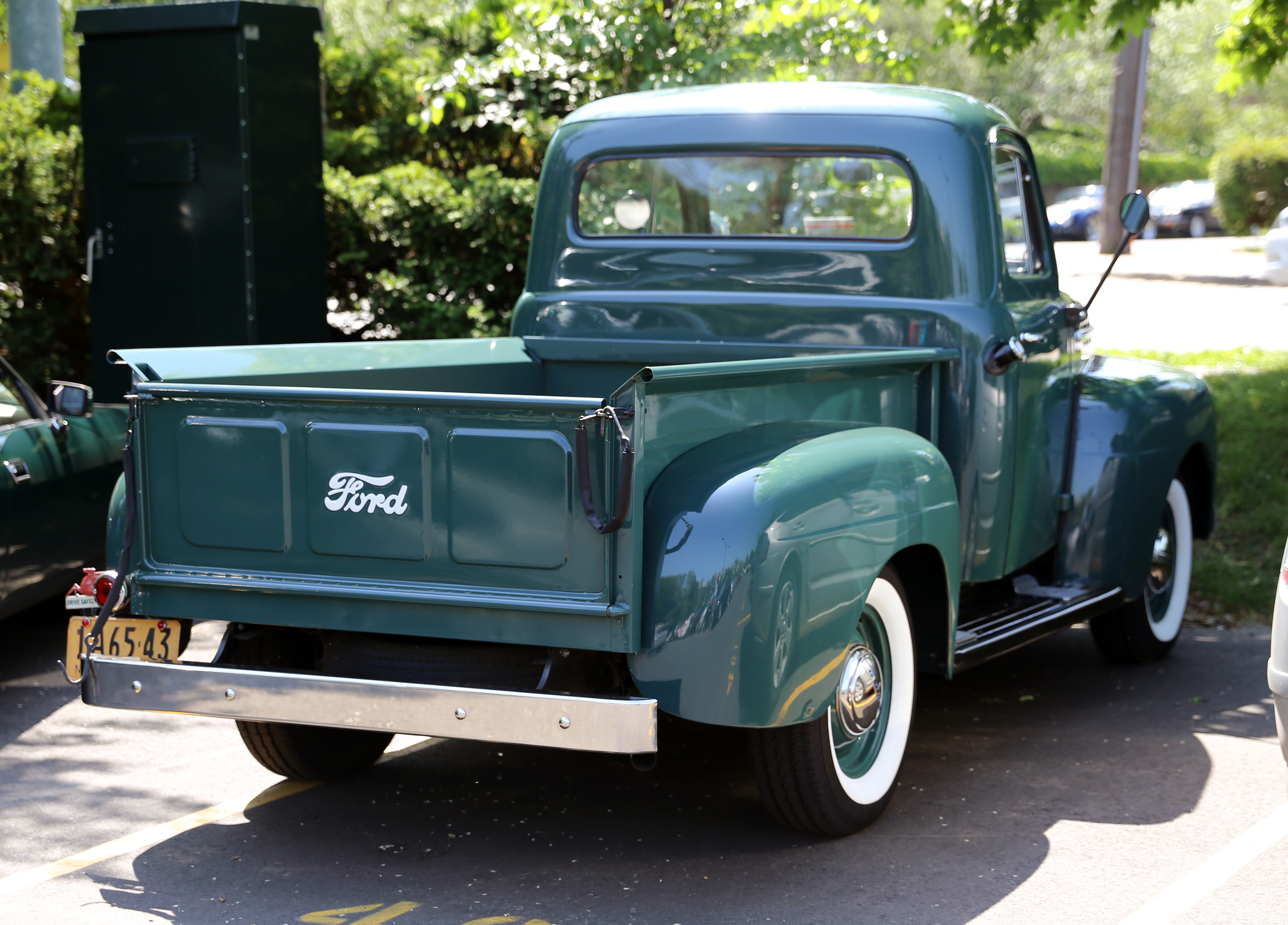
1951 Ford F-1, showing the larger rear window

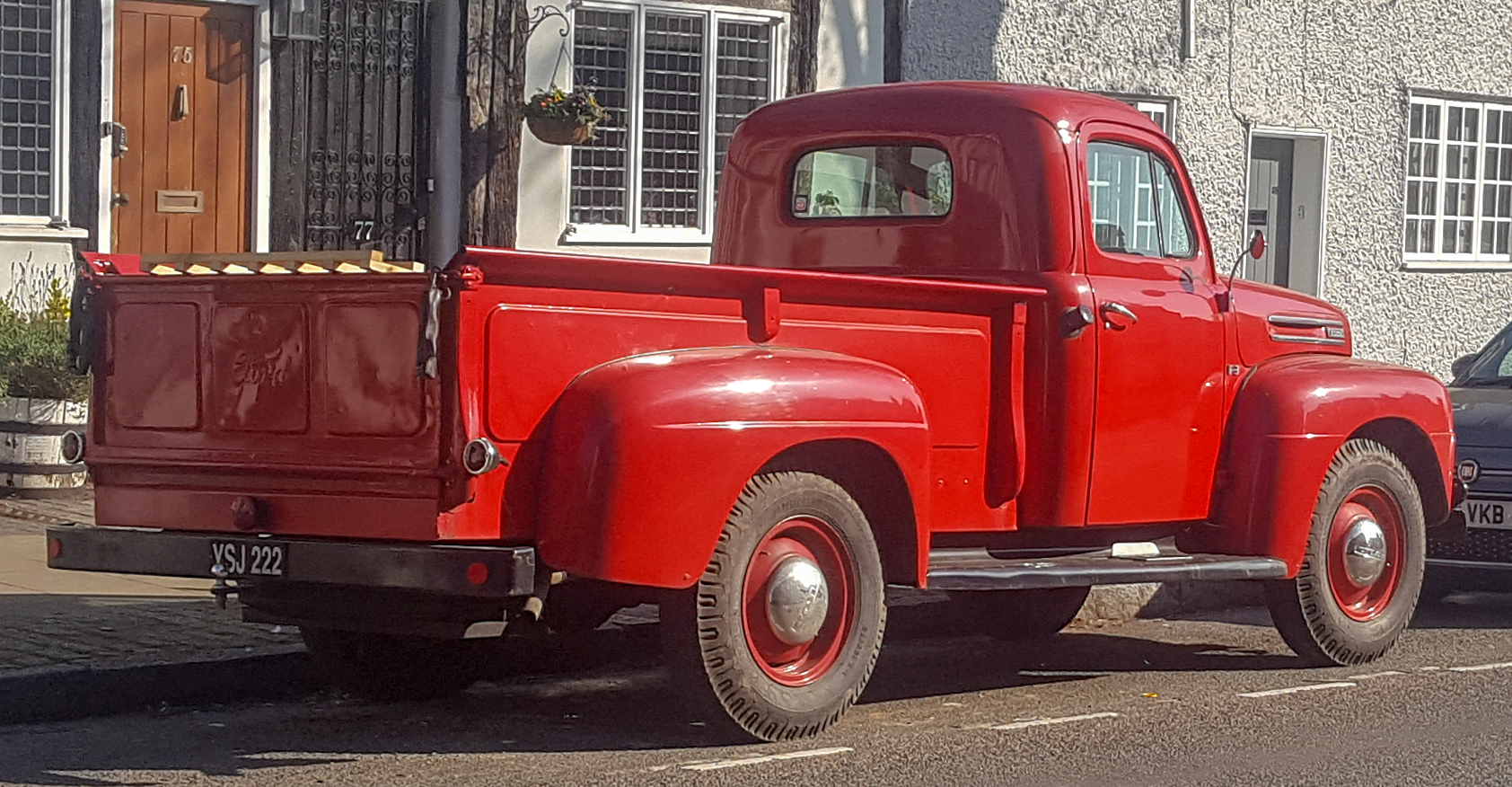
1949 Ford F-3, showing the smaller rear window

- 1948: Featured wider, longer, and taller cabs. Model designations for trucks were badged as F-1s. Heater only (no defroster). Running boards curved over the frame and under the cab.
- 1949: The most noticeable change on the 1949 trucks was the deletion of the red pinstripes on the silver-painted grille bars. Wheels were painted to match body color, rather than the previous black wheels. Defroster added as an option. Running boards trimmed at the frame for ease of replacement. Passenger-side taillight became standard as well as reflectors on both sides.
- 1950: The standard three-speed shift was relocated from the floor to the steering column mid-year. Additionally, the bed lost its structural indents, becoming smooth-sided, and the tailgate chain brackets were now welded to the roll instead of inside it. These changes were kept through 1951–52.
- 1951: The grille was restyled with a large horizontal bar, moving the headlights further apart, painted either ivory or argent, with either painted or chrome headlight trim; the hood trim was also redesigned. If specified, a V-8 emblem appeared on the front fascia above the grille opening. The truck underwent several revisions, with the cab receiving a larger rear window and updated door panels; for pickup trucks, the tailgate was redesigned, along with the introduction of a hardwood floor.
- 1952: The builder's plate was attached to the inside of the glove box door. While predating a VIN, the information identified the series, model year, assembly plant, and production sequence as well as paint code and rear axle ratio.

== Powertrain ==
=== Engines ===
Engine	Engine Type	Years	Horsepower	Horsepower RPM	Torque	Torque RPM	Usage
215 cu in (3,520 cm^{3}) Ford	Inline 6	1952–1953	101 hp (75 kW)	3,000	145 lb⋅ft (197 N⋅m)	1,500	F-1 through F-4
226 cu in (3,700 cm^{3}) Flathead	Inline 6	1948–1951	95 hp (71 kW)	3,300	180 lb⋅ft (244 N⋅m)	1,500	F-1 through F-6
239 cu in (3,920 cm^{3}) Flathead	V8	1948–1952	100 hp (75 kW)	3,800	170 lb⋅ft (230 N⋅m)	1,500	F-1 through F-6
254 cu in (4,160 cm^{3}) Flathead	Inline 6	1948–1951	110 hp (82 kW)	3,400	212 lb⋅ft (287 N⋅m)	1,500	F-6 only
279 cu in (4,570 cm^{3}) Lincoln Y-block (EAL)	V8	1952–1955	145 hp (108 kW)	3,800	246 lb⋅ft (334 N⋅m)	1,600	F-7 only
317 cu in (5,190 cm^{3}) Lincoln Y-block (EAM)	V8	1952–1955	155 hp (116 kW)	3,900	284 lb⋅ft (385 N⋅m)	1,600	F-8 only
337 cu in (5,520 cm^{3}) Flathead	V8	1948–1951	145 hp (108 kW)	3,600	265 lb⋅ft (359 N⋅m)	1,500	F-7 and F-8

=== Transmissions ===
All are manual.

- 3-speed light-duty: F-1 only
- 3-speed heavy-duty: F-1 through F-5
- 4-speed (spur gear): F-1 through F-6
- 4-speed Synchro-Silent: F-4 through F-6
- 5-speed overdrive: F-7 and F-8
- 5-speed direct drive: F-7 and F-8
