= Ford F-Series (second generation) =

Second generation of the Ford F-Series pickup trucks

Second generation
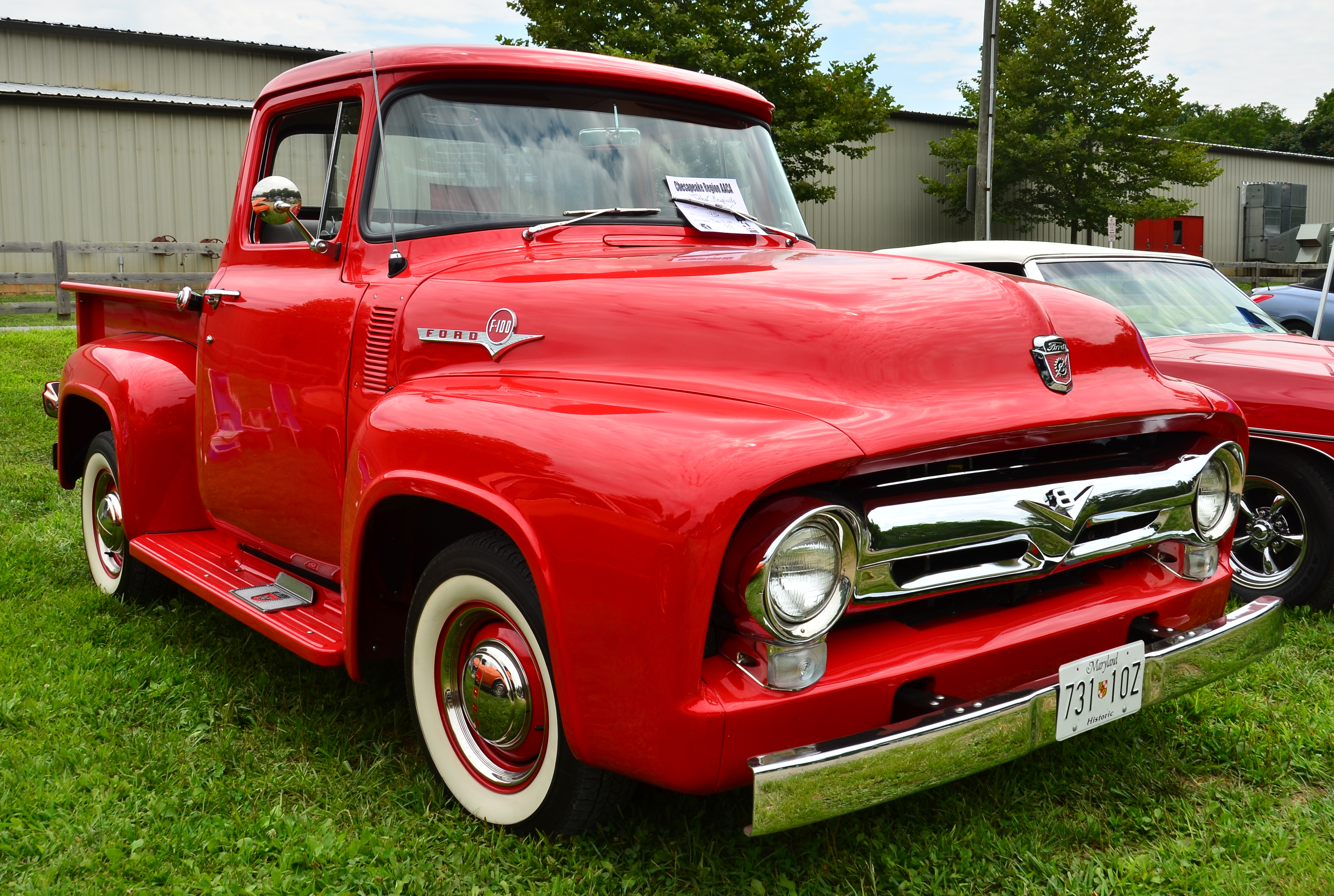
- 1956 Ford F-100

Overview
- Manufacturer: Ford
- Also called: Mercury M-Series (Canada)
- Production: 1952–1956; 1957–1962 (Brazil)
- Model years: 1953–1956
- Assembly: Chester, Pennsylvania, USA; Chicago, Illinois, USA; Dallas, Texas, USA; Dearborn, Michigan, USA; Edison, New Jersey, USA; Hapeville, Georgia, USA; Highland Park, Michigan, USA; Kansas City, Missouri, USA; Long Beach, California, USA; Louisville, Kentucky, USA; Norfolk, Virginia, USA; St. Louis, Missouri, USA; St. Paul, Minnesota, USA; San Jose, California, USA; São Paulo, Brazil (Ford Brazil)

Body and chassis
- Class: Full-size pickup truck
- Body style: 2-door pickup 4-door panel truck
- Layout: FR layout

Powertrain
- Engine: 215 CID (3.5 L) I6; 223 CID (3.7 L) Mileage Maker I6; 239 CID (3.9 L) Flathead V8; 239 CID (3.9 L) Y-block V8; 256 CID (4.2 L) Y-block V8; 279 CID (4.6 L) Lincoln Y-block V8; 317 CID (5.2 L) Lincoln Y-block V8
- Transmission: 3-speed manual 4-speed manual 3-speed Ford-O-Matic automatic

Dimensions
- Wheelbase: 110.0 in (2,794 mm) (F-100); 118.0 in (2,997 mm) (F-250); 130.0 in (3,302 mm) (F-350)
- Length: 189.1 in (4,803 mm) (F-100)

Chronology
- Predecessor: Ford F-Series (first generation) (1948–1952)
- Successor: Ford F-Series (third generation) (1957–1960)

The second generation of the Ford F-Series is a series of trucks that was produced by Ford from the 1953 to 1956 model years. Marketed as the "Triple Economy" series, the second-generation F-Series again encompassed a comprehensive range of vehicles, ranging from light-duty pickup trucks to heavy-duty commercial vehicles.

This generation saw a revision to the F-Series model nomenclature, shifting from a one-digit model number to a three-digit number; F-100 to F-350. This system has remained in use on all Ford F-Series trucks to the present day. Alongside the naming change, this generation marked several firsts for the F-Series, including an adjustable seat (wide enough for three people), power brakes, and the introduction of the Ford-O-Matic automatic transmission as an option. In line with Ford cars, seat belts were introduced as an option for 1956.

The second-generation F-Series was produced by Ford at eleven facilities across the United States; Ford Canada marketed the model line under both the F-Series and the Mercury M-Series nameplates. Ford of Brazil inaugurated local production with the model line, producing it from 1957 to 1962.

== Model overview ==
In its redesign of the Ford F-Series, Ford set out to upgrade the capability of the vehicle line. Along with increasing payload capacity, designers redesigned the suspension to improve steering control. The cab was widened, bringing a larger windshield and rear window. Shortened to a 110-inch wheelbase (from 114 inches), the front axle was moved rearward to further improve turning radius and lower the hoodline. A 20-inch-deep cargo bed was introduced; though the width would change, the depth remained the same through the seventh-generation F-Series of 1980.

=== 1953 ===
Distinguished by a two-bar grille, the 1953 F-Series internally denoted the 50th anniversary of Ford Motor Company with a commemorative emblem on the steering wheel horn button. Alongside a completely redesigned chassis and body, the engine line was in transition, carrying over the 101 hp (75 kW) inline-6 as the standard engine with the optional 100 hp (75 kW) Flathead V8.

In a one-year-only combination, the Flathead V8 was offered with the newly optional Ford-O-Matic transmission.

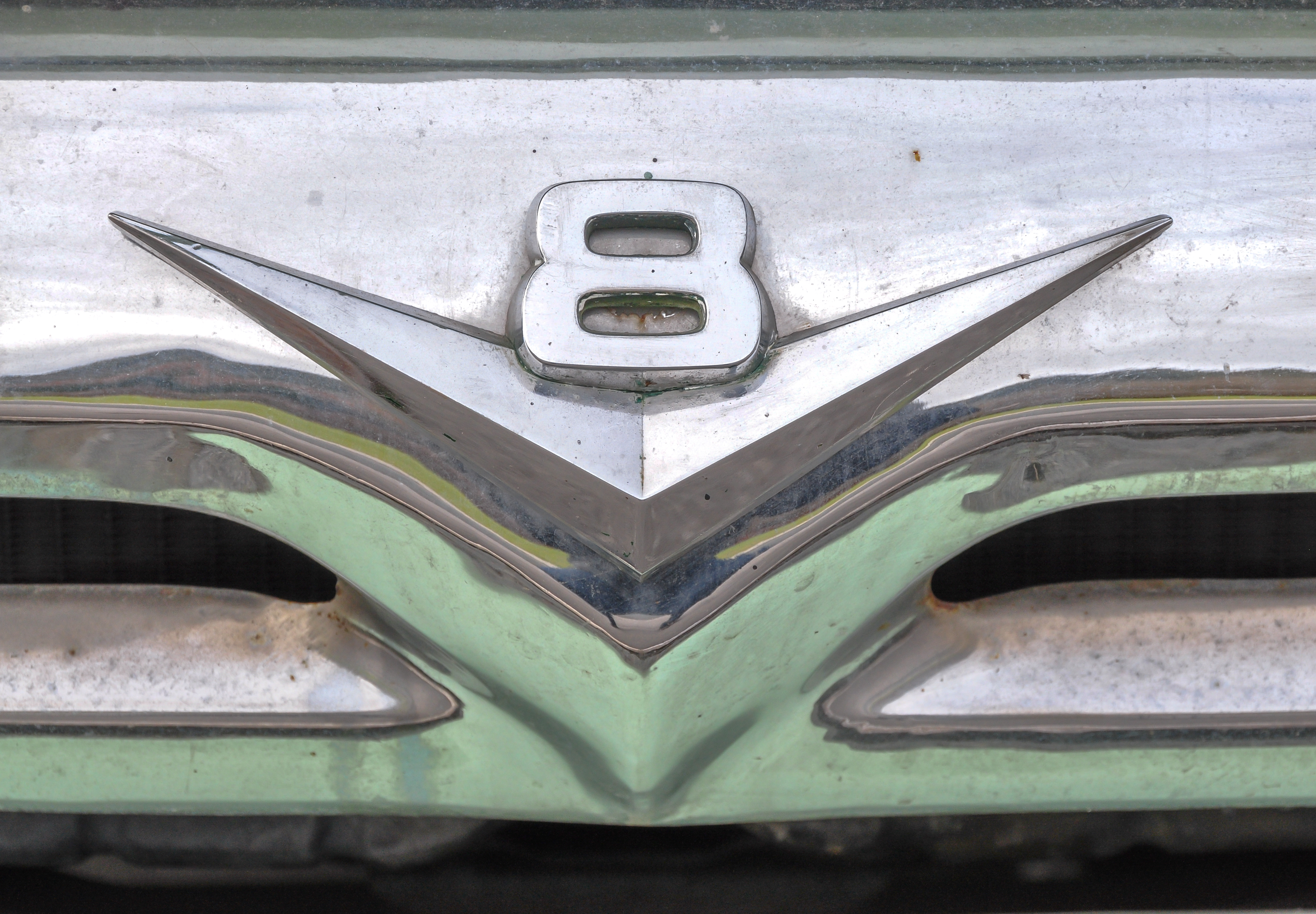
V8 emblem on the grille of a 1953 Ford F-100

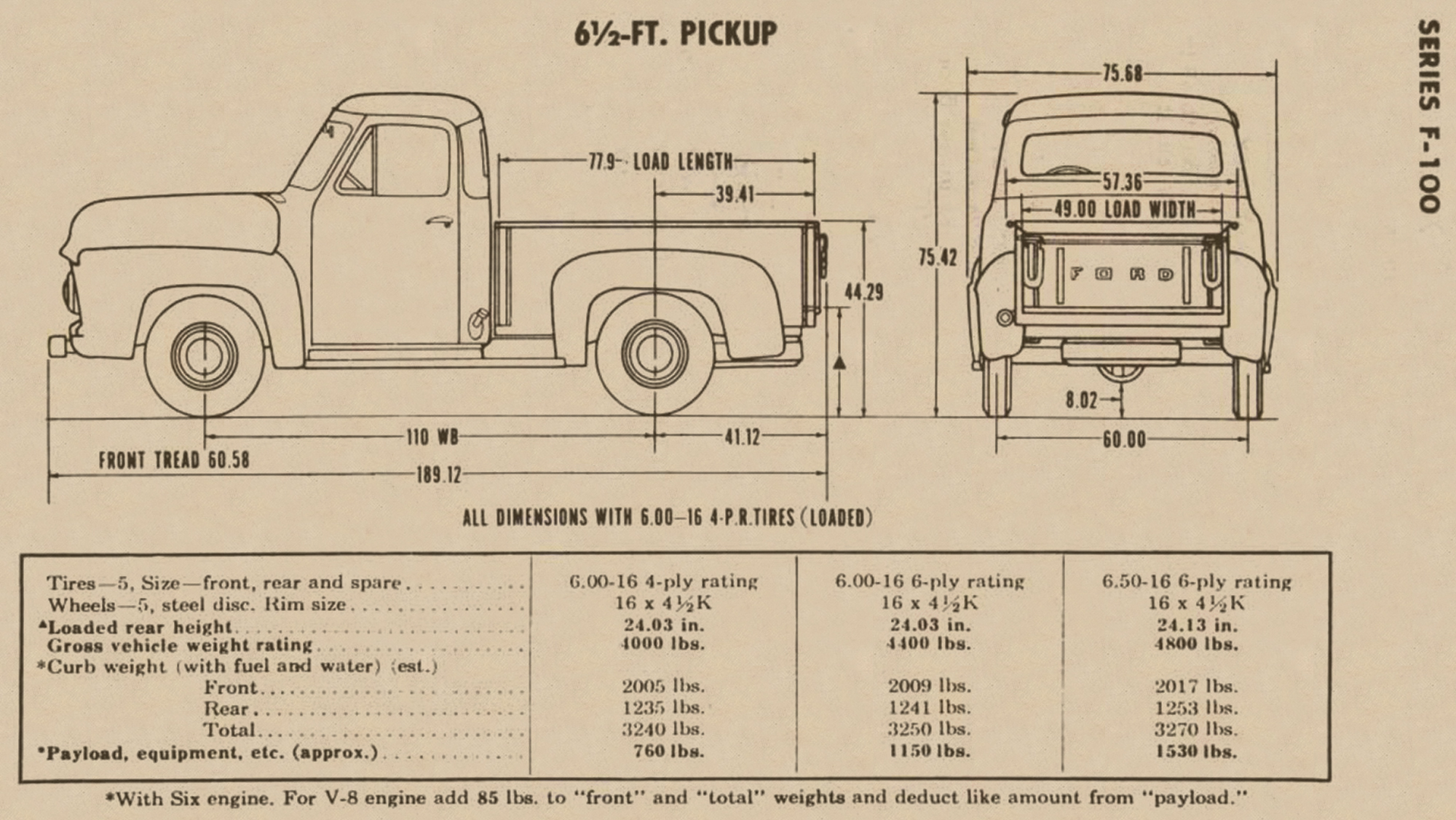
Dimension sketch of a 1953 Ford F-100

=== 1954 ===
For 1954, the grille was revised, introducing a single slanted design between the headlamps. The powertrain lineup saw further change; along with a newly enlarged 223 cubic-inch inline-6 base engine (increased to 115 hp), the Flathead V8 (which made its debut in the 1939 Mercury) was discontinued. Again using a 239 cubic-inch displacement, the overhead-valve 130 hp Y-Block V8 brought a significant increase in power output. The availability of Ford-O-Matic was expanded from the F-100 to F-250 and F-350 trucks.

=== 1955 ===
For 1955, a double-bar grille returned, distinguished with a center notch (for the V8 emblem) and revised hood emblems. Tubeless tires were introduced as an option. The Custom Cab was introduced, grouping multiple upgraded interior options in a single option package.

=== 1956 update ===
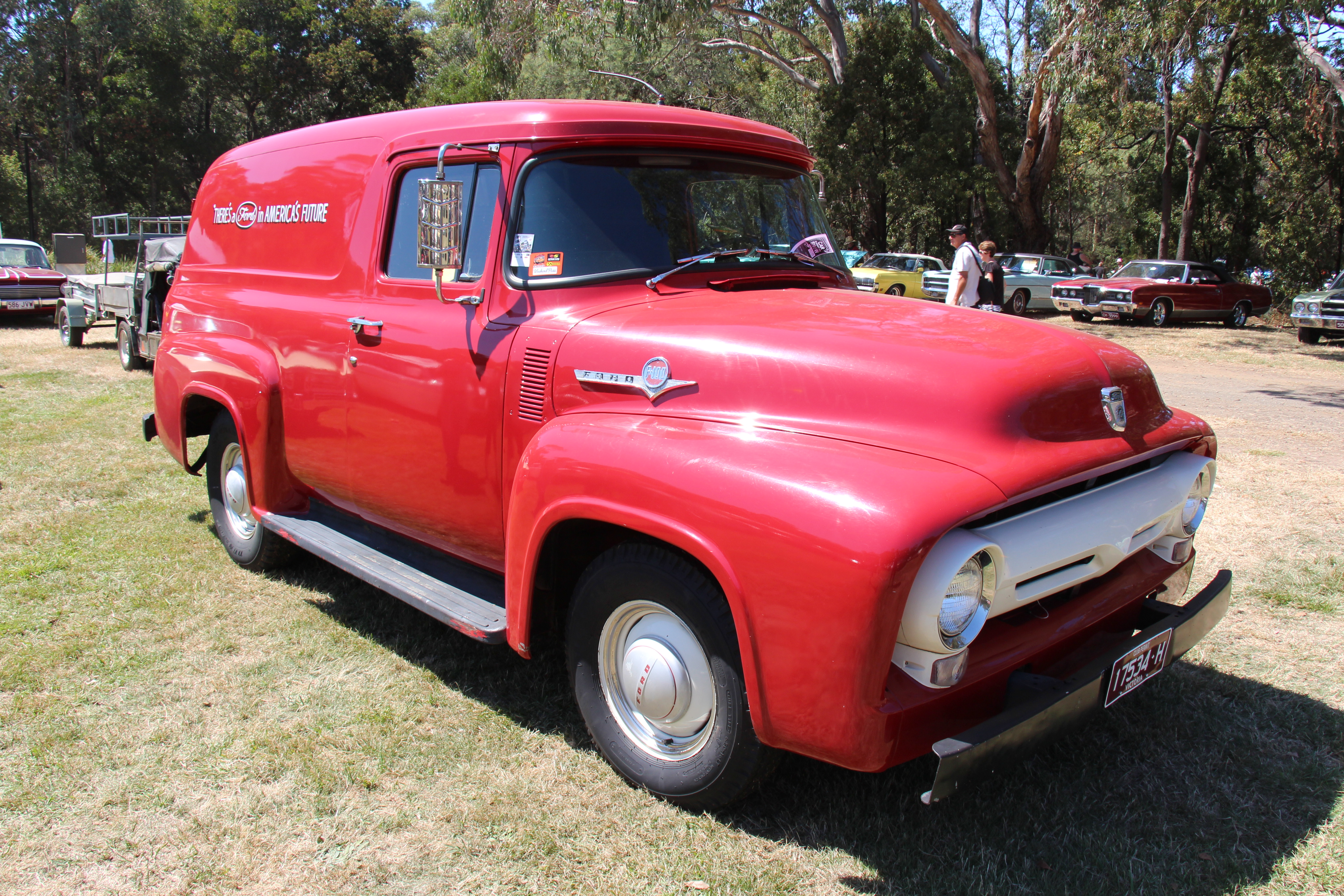
Ford F-100 panel van

For its final year of production, the second-generation F-Series received a redesign of the cab, adopting a vertical A-pillar and wraparound windshield; a rarely-seen option included a wraparound rear window. While the cab saw significant change, the front bodywork remained largely unchanged, with only minor changes to the grille.

Several functional changes were introduced for 1956, with the F-Series adopting electric (instead of vacuum-powered) windshield wipers, tubeless tires (on models above the F-100), and a 12-volt electric system. A deep-dish "Lifeguard" steering wheel was standard, while seatbelts were offered as an option.

After an initial increase to 256 cubic inches for 1955, the Y-block was enlarged to 272 cubic inches for 1956; three versions were offered, producing up to 167 hp.

=== Powertrain details ===
The 1954 F-100 was the last year for the flathead engine in the U.S. Models in Canada, including the Mercury M-Series, continued to use the flathead. 1954–55 saw the introduction of the new 239 CID overhead valve Y-block V8, dubbed "Power King." The six-cylinder engine's displacement was also increased, from 215 to 223 CID, and power steering was introduced as an option. In the succeeding years, the 239 Y-block was replaced with the 256, 272, and 317 engines for medium- and heavy-duty variants.

With pickup trucks, the standard transmission was a 3-speed column-shifted synchronized manual; optional transmissions included a 3-speed manual with overdrive and a 4-speed manual (with low first gear). A Ford-O-Matic 3-speed automatic transmission was also optional.

Engine	Years	Power
215 cu in (3,520 cm^{3}) Straight-6	1953	101 hp (75 kW)
239 cu in (3,920 cm^{3}) Flathead V8	1953	100 hp (75 kW)
223 cu in (3,650 cm^{3}) Mileage Maker I6	1954–55	115 hp (86 kW)
239 cu in (3,920 cm^{3}) Y-block V8	1954–55	130 hp (97 kW)
223 cu in (3,650 cm^{3}) Mileage Maker I6	1956	137 hp (102 kW)
256 cu in (4,200 cm^{3}) Y-block V8	1955	140 hp (104 kW)
272 cu in (4,460 cm^{3}) Truck 2V Y-block V8	1956	172 hp (128 kW)
279 cu in (4,570 cm^{3}) Lincoln Y-block V8	1954–56	152 hp (113 kW)
317 cu in (5,190 cm^{3}) Lincoln Y-block V8	1954–56	170 hp (127 kW)

== Models ==
As part of the model change from the first generation, the model nomenclature for the F-Series was changed from a single number denoting each model series to a three-digit model number. As of current production, Ford still uses this nomenclature on its F-Series trucks today, with minor revisions (the F-100 was replaced entirely by the F-150 and medium-duty trucks now use the F-x50 designation). This nomenclature is also currently used by the Ford E-Series and (in North America) by its Ford Transit successor.

Among F-Series pickup truck lines, the 1/2-ton F-1 became the F-100, the F-2 and F-3 were consolidated into the 3/4-ton F-250, with the F-4 becoming the 1-ton F-350. The medium-duty F-5 (1 1/2-ton) and F-6 (2-ton) became the F-500 and F-600, respectively. The heavy-duty F-7, F-8, and F-9 "Big Job" trucks became the F-700, F-750, F-800, and F-900 series.

For 1956, lower-GVWR versions of the F-100 and the F-250 were introduced (under the F-110 and F-260 model codes).

=== Variants ===
Alongside the medium-duty and Big Job F-Series conventional-cab trucks, Ford sold the C-Series COE, configured with a raised cab and shortened hood. This would be the final generation of the C-Series based on the F-Series trucks, as Ford introduced the tilt-cab Ford C-Series for 1957; the model line was produced in a single generation until 1990.

The B-Series was a cowled chassis derived from the F-500 through F-750; though typically used for school buses, the platform was also used to underpin other conventional-type buses as well.

Alongside its pickup truck body, the F-100 was also produced as a panel truck (a precursor to the E-Series van) and as a chassis-cab truck.

== Gallery ==
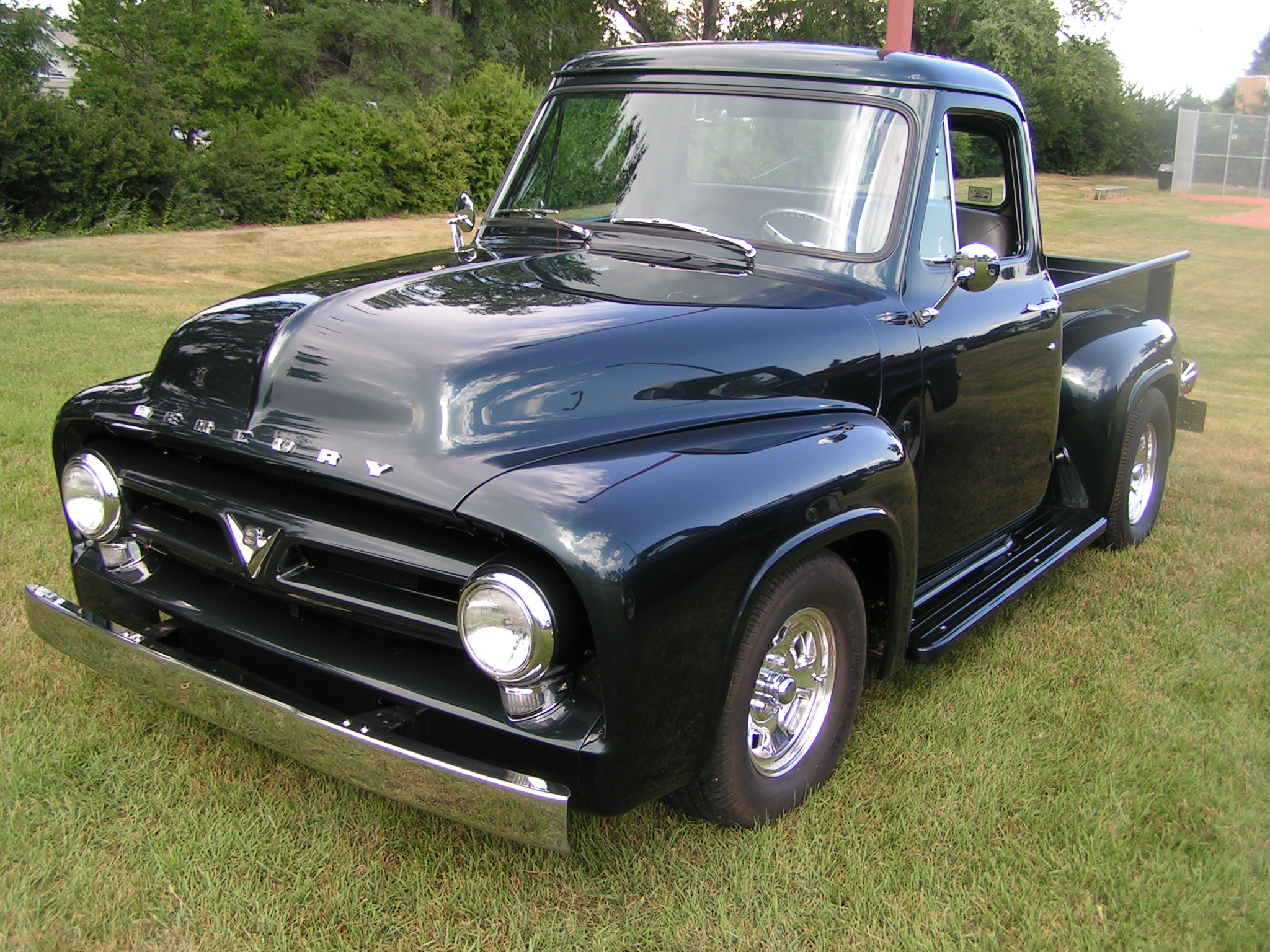
1953 Mercury M-100, a Canada-only rebadged F-100

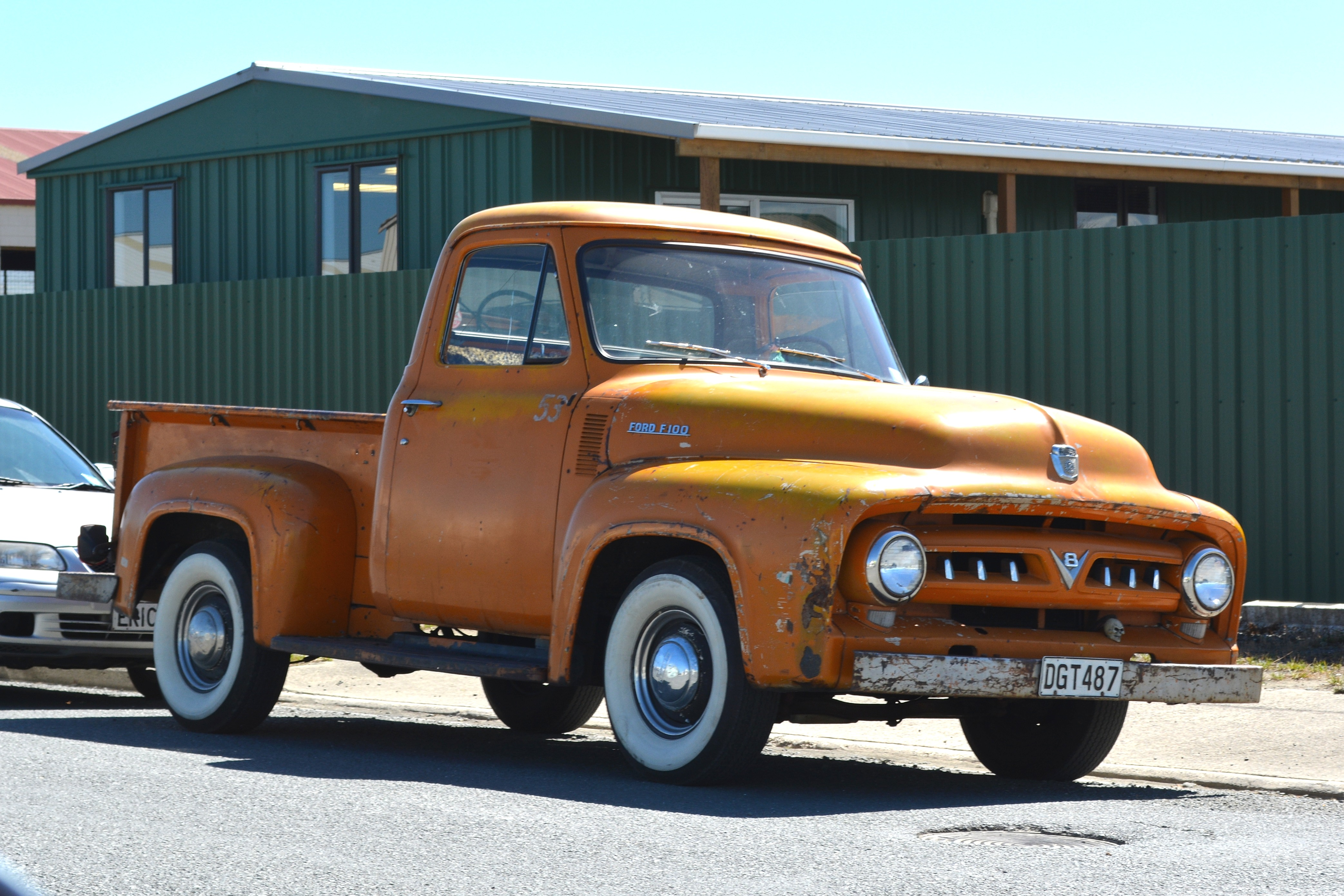
1953 Ford F-100

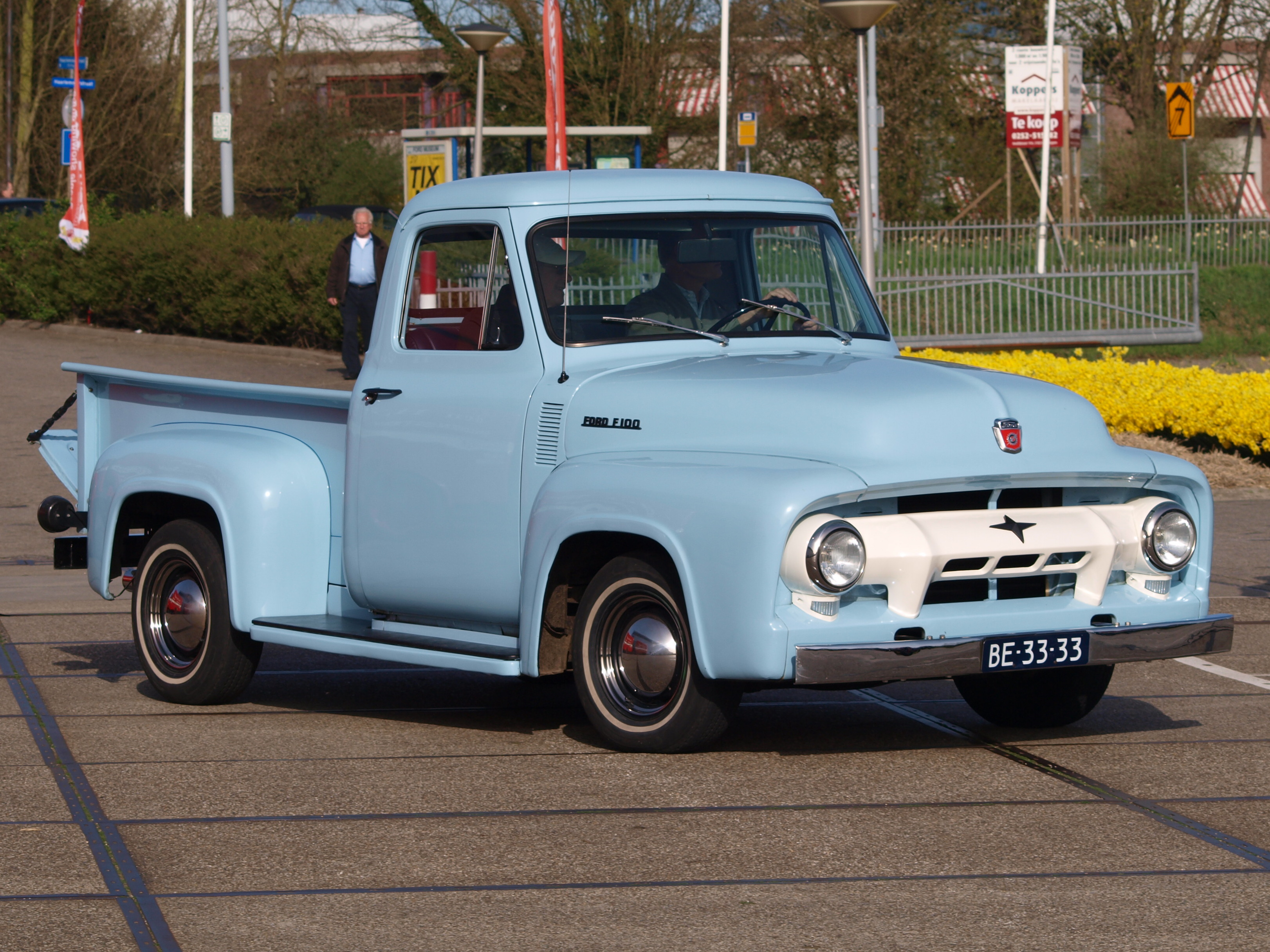
1954 Ford F-100

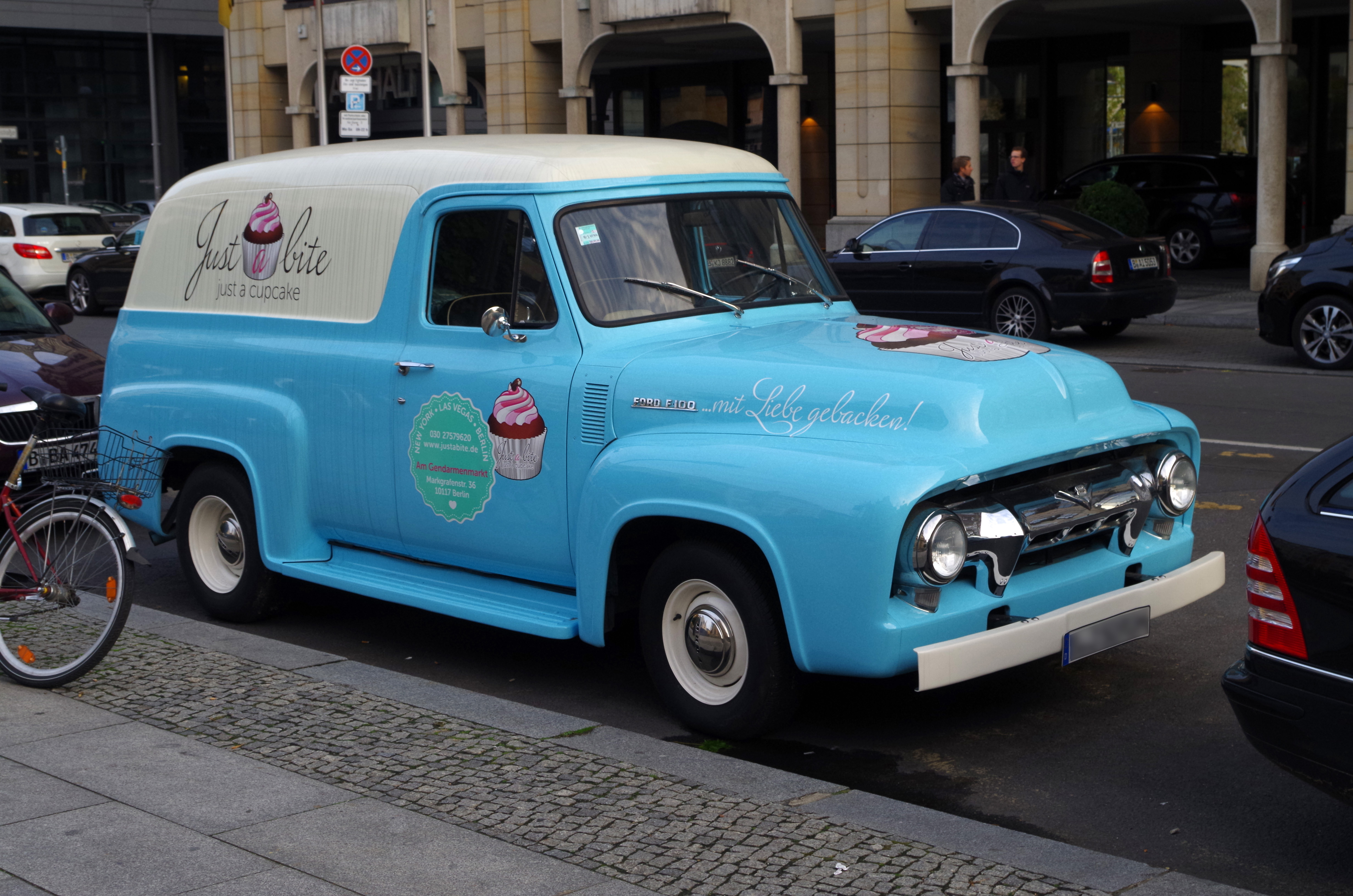
1954 Ford F-100 panel truck

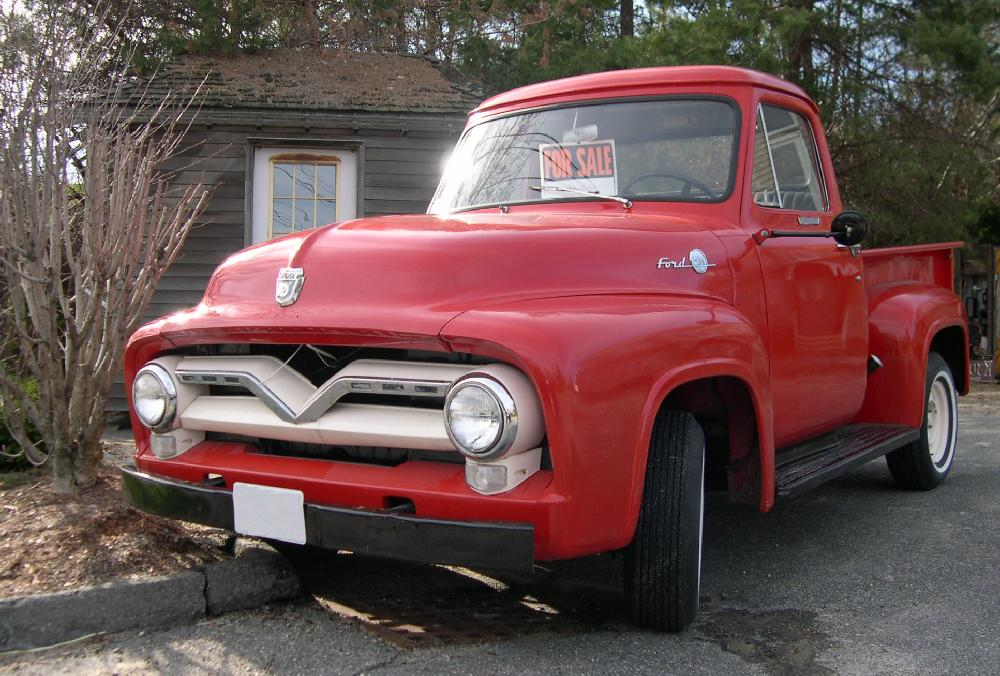
1955 Ford F-100

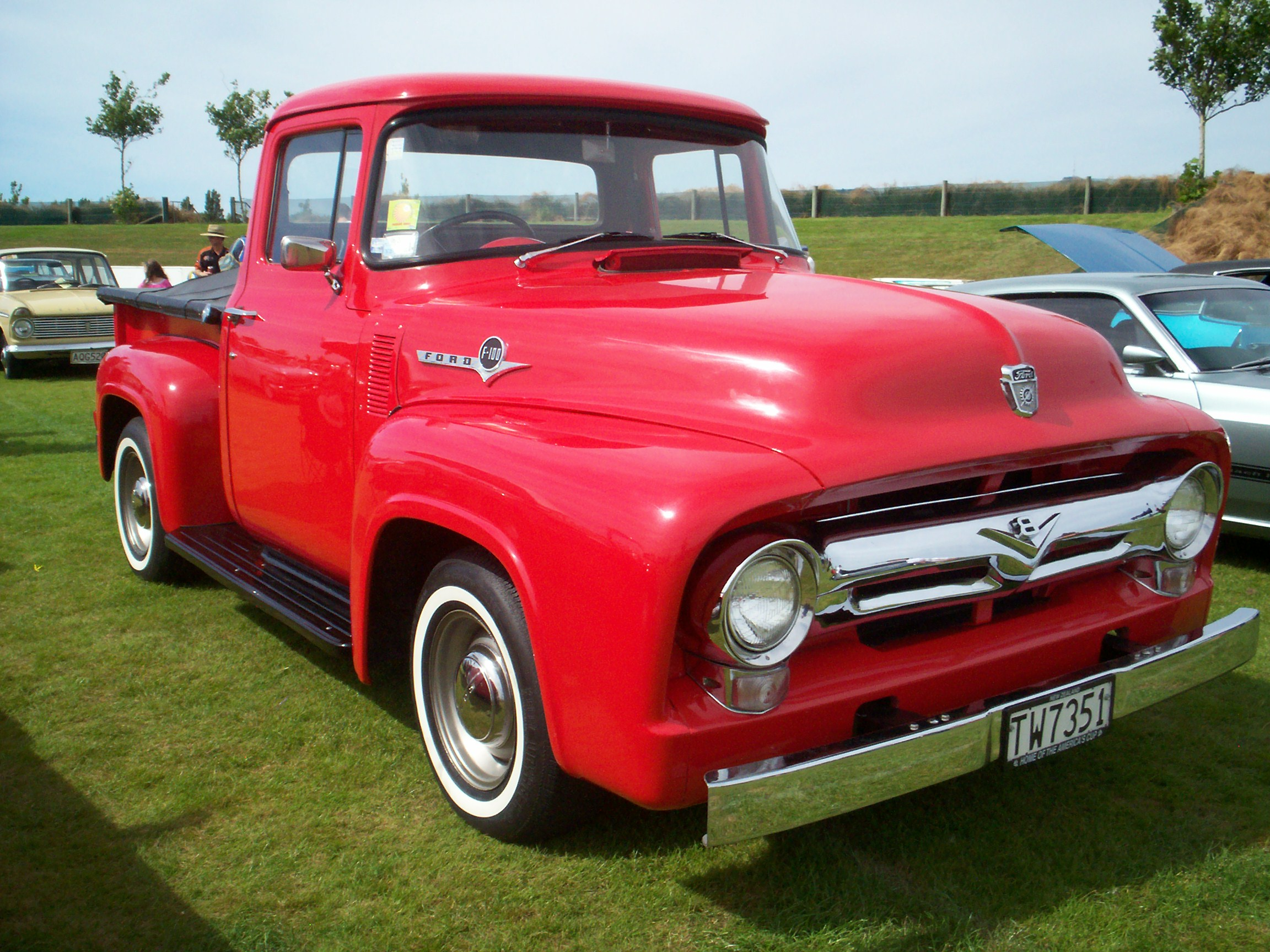
1956 Ford F-100

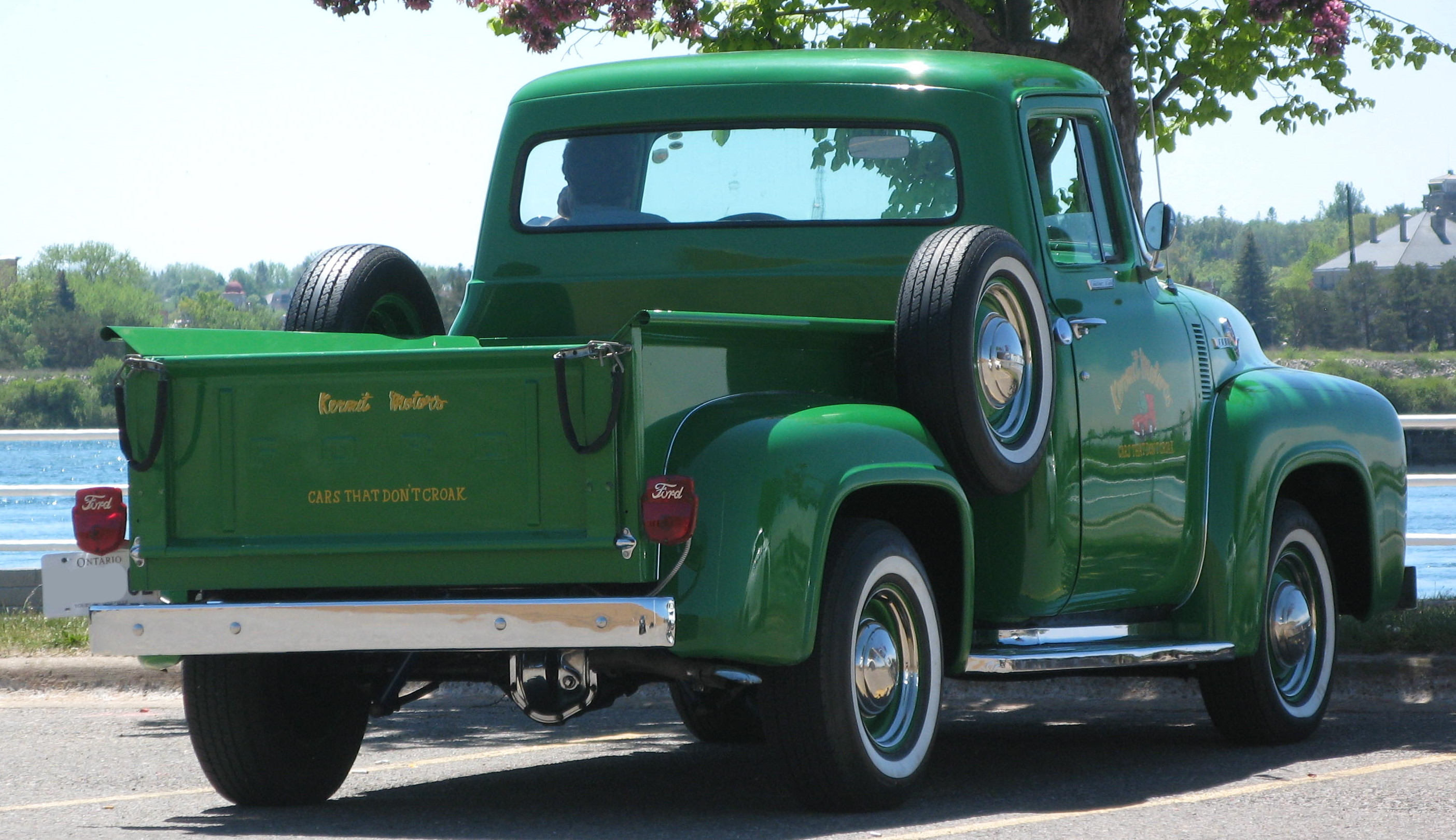
1956 Ford F-100, rear view
