= Ford C series =

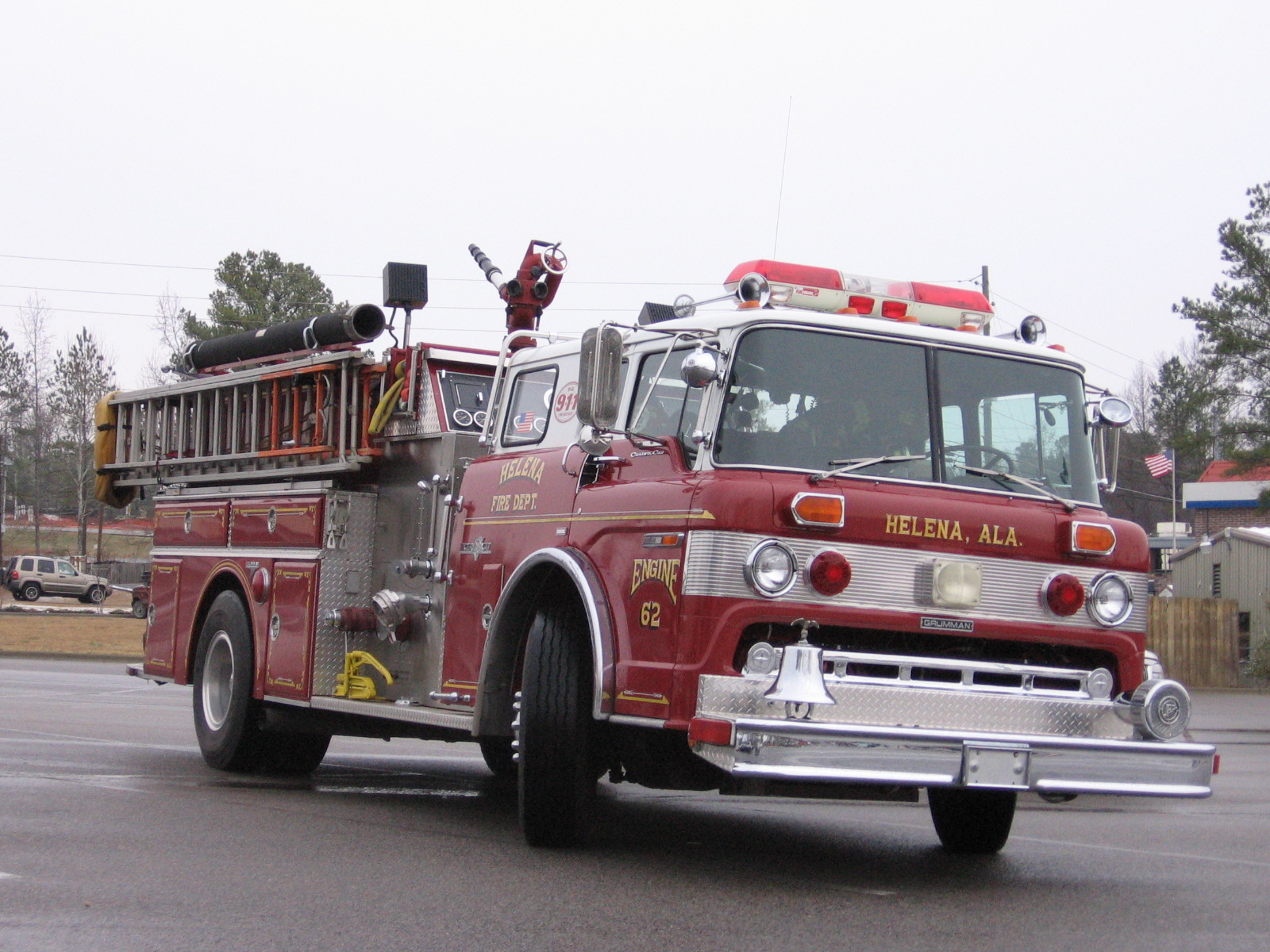

Overview
- Manufacturer: Ford
- Also called: Mercury M series (Canada)
- Production: 1957–1990
- Assembly: Louisville Assembly Plant, Louisville, Kentucky (1957–1969); Kentucky Truck Assembly, Louisville, Kentucky (1969–1990)

Body and chassis
- Class: Medium-duty truck
- Body style: Cab over
- Related: Ford H-Series (1961–1966); Mack Model N (1958–1962)

Powertrain
- Engine: Gasoline; Diesel
- Transmission: Manual; Automatic

Chronology
- Predecessor: Ford C series (F-Series COE)
- Successor: Ford Cargo

The Ford C series is a range of trucks that was produced by Ford from 1957 to 1990. The first tilting-cab cabover (COE) truck produced by Ford, the C series produced the namesake fixed-cab variant of the F-Series produced from 1948 to 1956. Produced in both straight (rigid) truck and semitractor configurations, many versions of the C series were produced, ranging from Class 5 to Class 8 GVWRs.

Serving as a popular basis for fire apparatus, the Ford C series was developed by Ford into the larger H series COE (its first diesel-engine truck). Though Ford would make several updates to the powertrain offerings, the overall design of the model line underwent saw few changes during its entire production. In 1986, Ford introduced the CF8000/CFT 8000, phasing it in as the replacement for the C Series.

For 33 years of production, Ford produced the C series in Louisville, Kentucky, moving assembly from its Louisville Assembly Plant to Kentucky Truck Assembly in 1969. In 2026, the Ford E-350/E-450 (still in production as a chassis/cutaway cab) overtook the C Series as the longest-produced Ford design, remaining in production since the 1992 model year.

== C series COE (1948–1956) ==
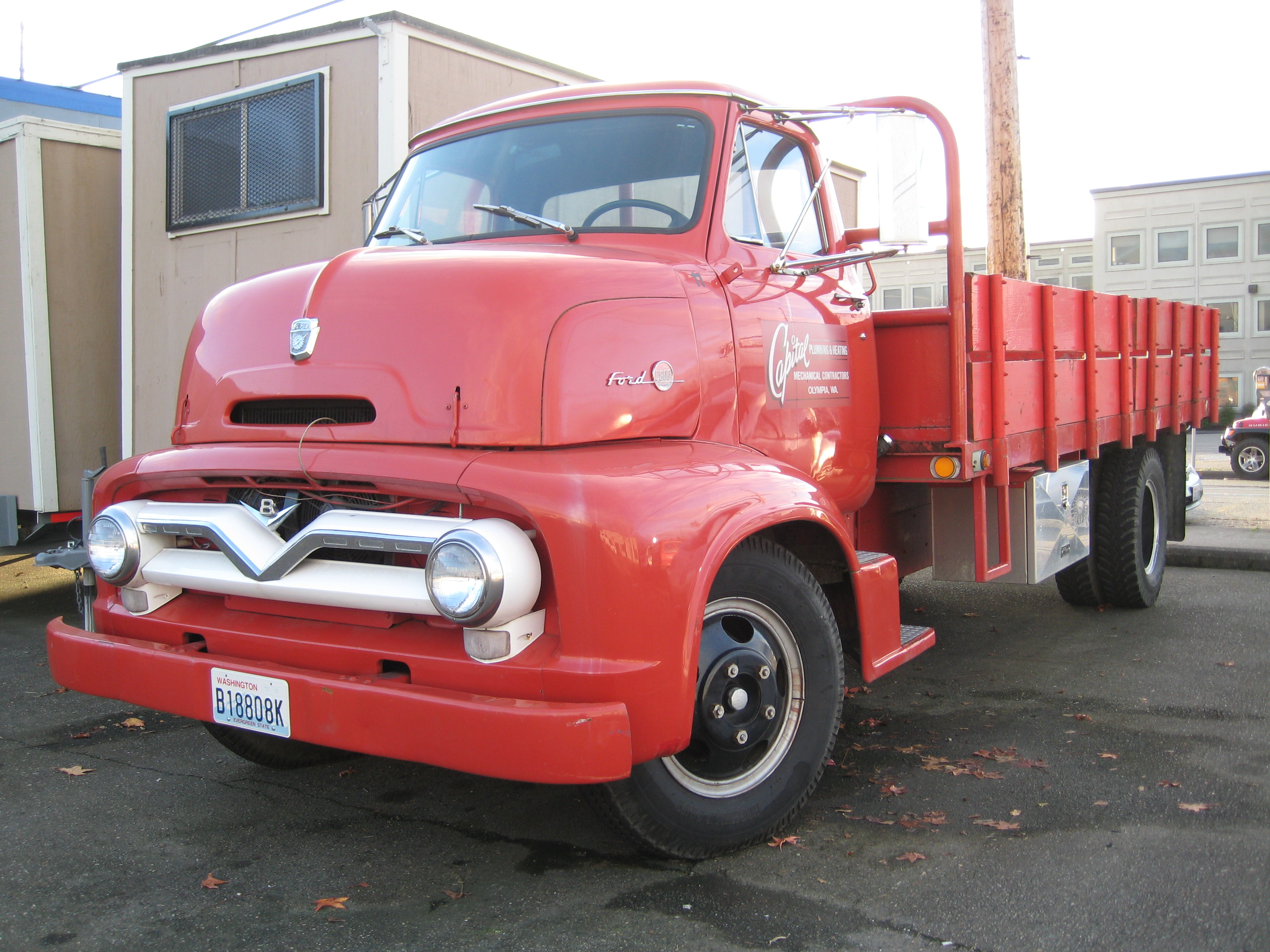
"Helmet-shaped" COE (1955 Ford C-600)

Like other automotive manufacturers that built COE trucks before the 1960s, early Ford C series trucks were "helmet-shaped", cab-forward trucks that shared components with pickup trucks (the F-Series, in this case). From 1948 to 1952, they were simply COE versions of the F-5, F-6, F-7, and F-8. For 1953, they were redesignated the C series, but largely remained modified F-Series trucks.

Models consisted of the C-500, C-600, C-700, C-750, C-800, C-850, and C-900. Like the F-900, the C-900 also included a "Big Job" model. Diesel-engined trucks included an extra zero in the model designations (i.e. C-8000 or C-9000).

== Design history ==
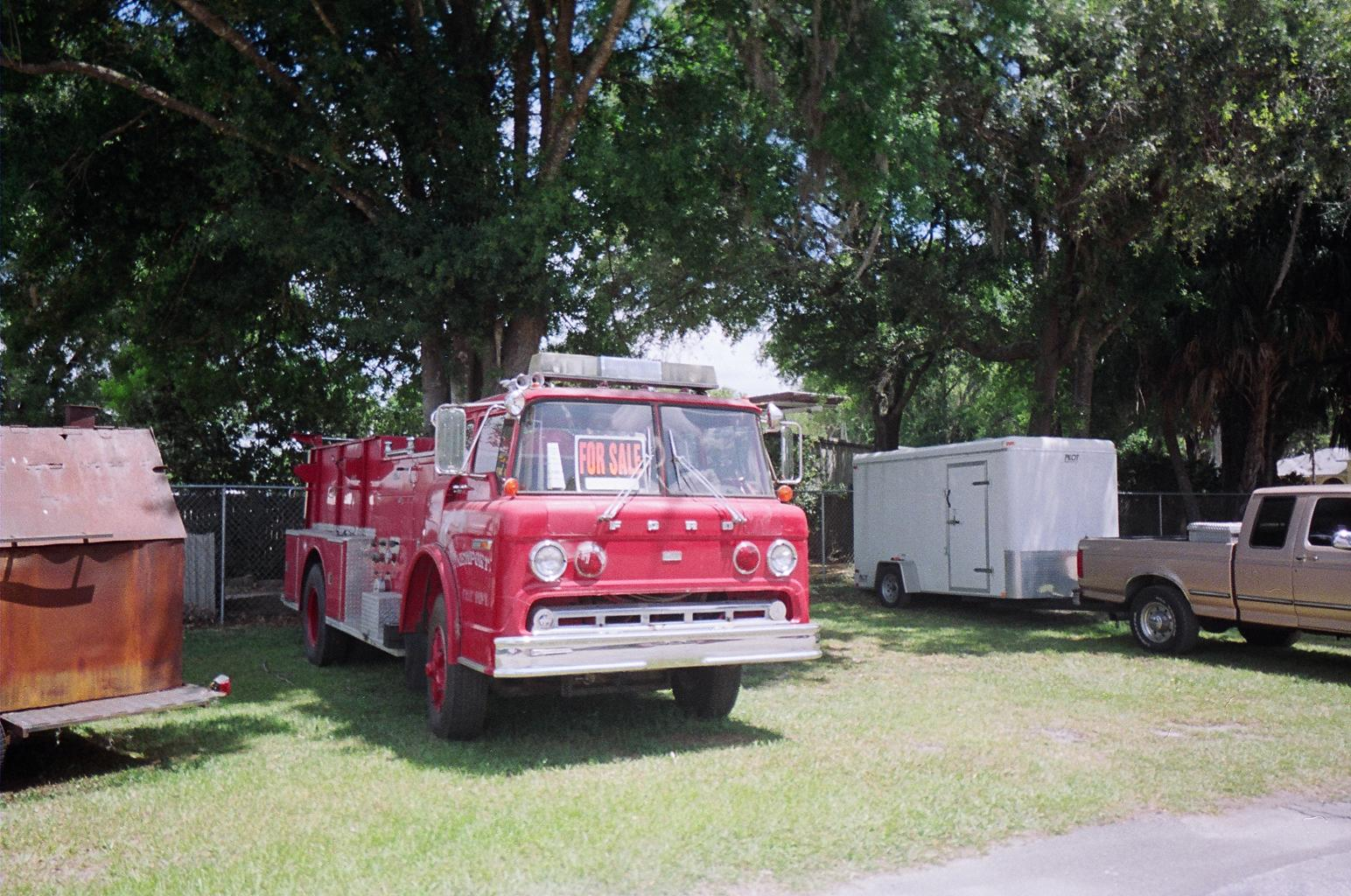
1973 Ford C-900 fire truck

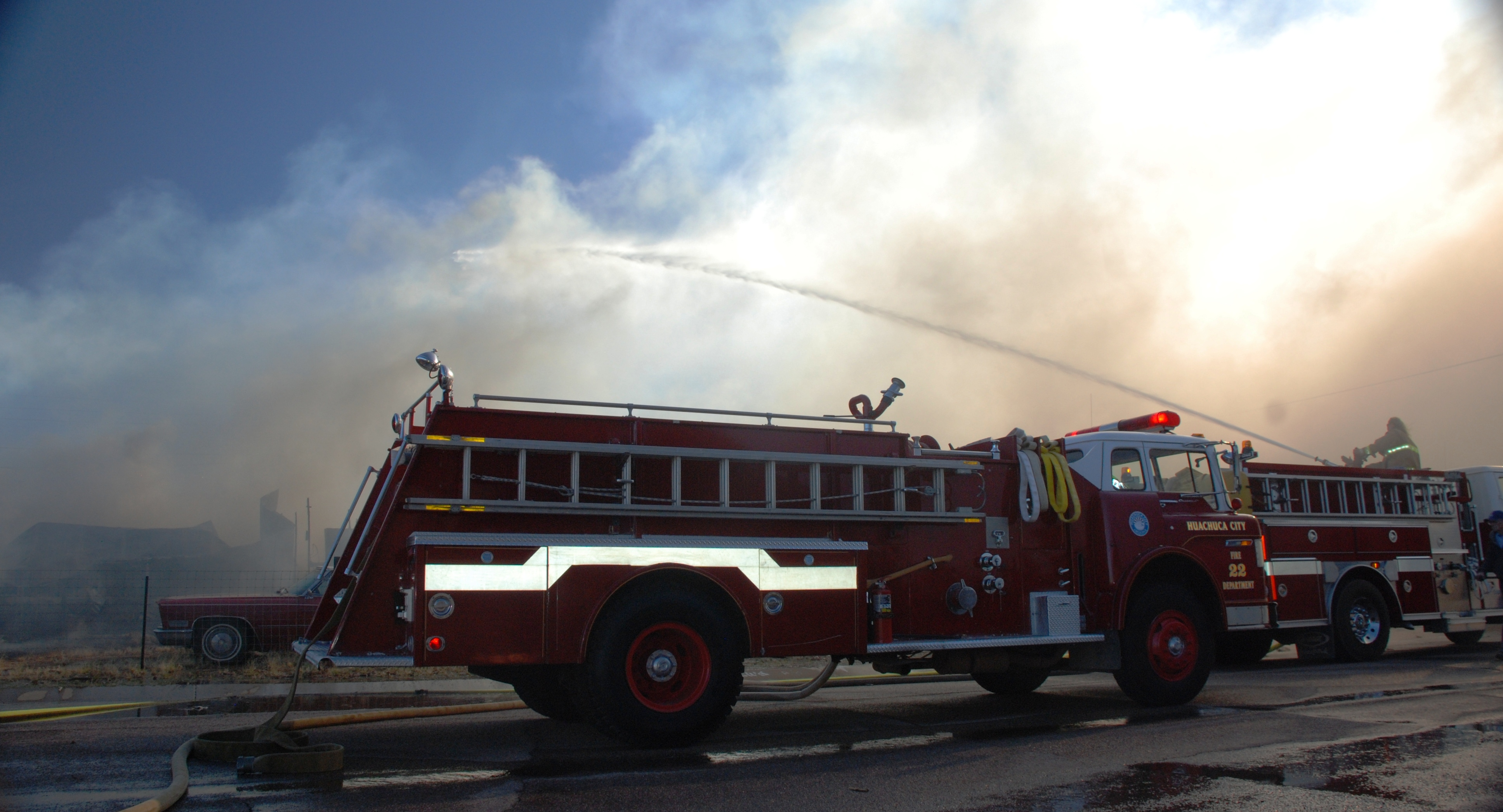
Ford C series fire truck in action in 2010

As Ford started squaring off its vehicles in 1957, they finally gave the cab-overs their own designs separate from the rest of the Ford truck lineup. It featured a small grille near the front bumper, with a four-pointed star emblem on each end, and the word "F O R D" spelled out below the windshield, and had a cog-and-lightning bolt crest emblem between the headlights. Variations of this emblem were found on many other Ford trucks during the 1950s and into the 1960s. The C series held onto this logo the longest.

=== Design updates ===
In a fashion similar to the Checker Marathon or Volkswagen Beetle, changes to the C series trucks throughout its production were very subtle. If anywhere, many of these changes were identifiable by the changes in the cowl insignias and badging. Between 1958 and 1960, the C series used a quad-headlight fascia. This was helpful for fire departments, which wanted to use the extra headlight bezels for emergency flashers, an option that was offered exclusively to fire and other emergency vehicles after 1960. In 1961, Ford reverted to the single-headlight design; the regular C series cab closely resembled the 1957 version. A new Super Duty model was added. Another option included a small sleeper cab.

==== 1963–1990 ====
For 1963, the C series was updated with the same cowl insignias used by the rest of the medium- and heavy-duty truck lineup. The logo had the word FORD on top of a trapezoid with the model number designation. This insignia was used until 1967. Also in 1963, Ford introduced diesel versions of the C series, as well as the N series and heavy-duty F Series.

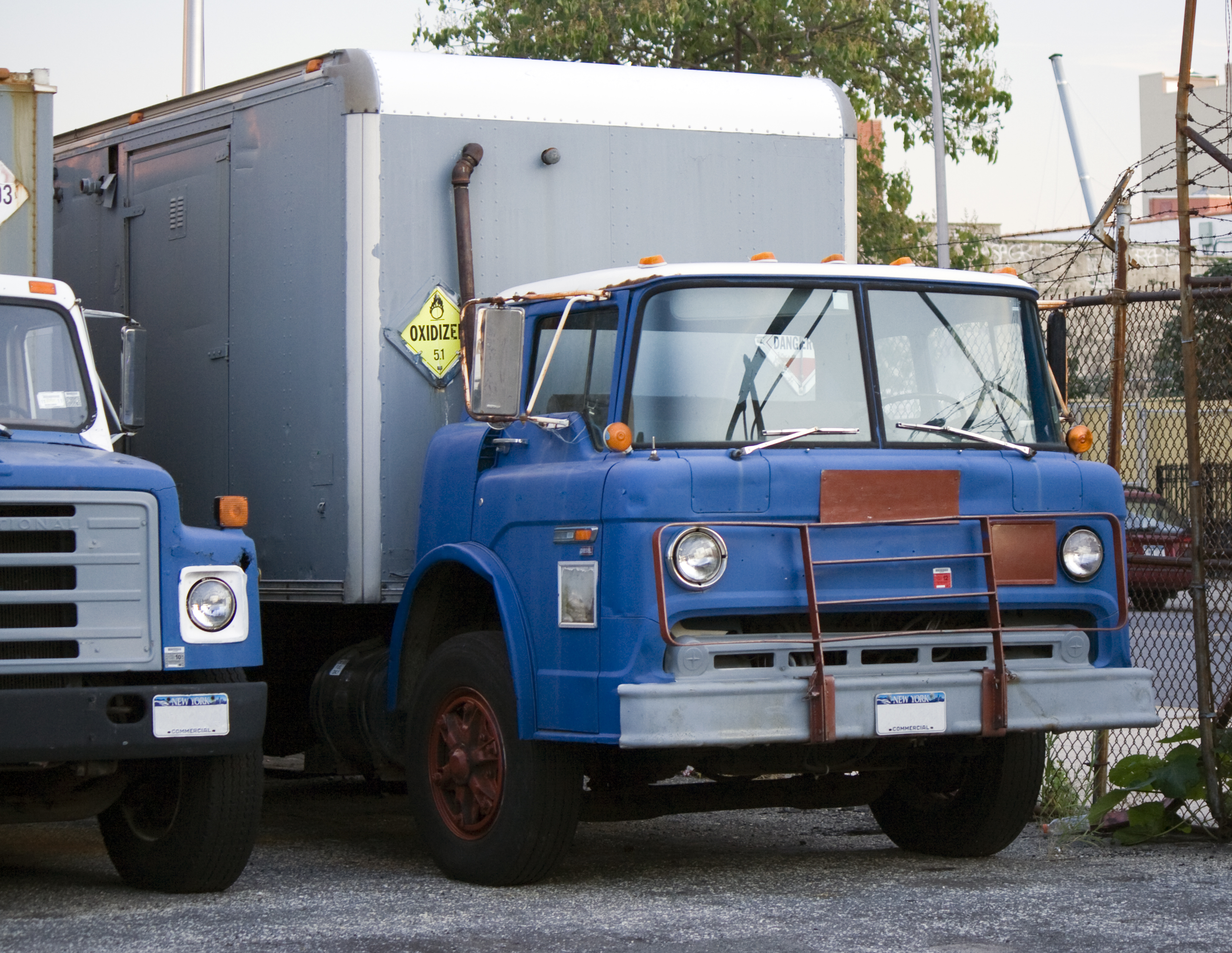
1986 Ford C-800 Diesel

In 1968, federal regulations required all automotive manufacturers to add side-marker reflectors or lights, which Ford was able to add to the new cowl insignia used on the F Series since 1967. That same year, Ford decided to add this insignia on the doors of the C series, as well. Unlike the Ford F Series, which removed them for 1973, the C series retained them until the end of production in 1990. After 1972, the Canadian Mercury version of the C series was discontinued, becoming the last Mercury truck until the 1993 Mercury Villager.

The year 1974 was the last for the cog-and-lightning bolt crest that graced the front of the C series trucks from the beginning, and other Ford trucks since the 1950s. In the 1980s, Ford began adding its blue oval logo to all models; it was added to the C series in 1984.

In 1981, the Ford Cargo was introduced by Ford of Britain as its largest truck line. For 1986, Ford began sales of the Cargo in North America, sourcing production from Ford Brasil. While the Cargo was largely intended to replace the C series, the popularity of the C series in niche applications led to both model lines marketed concurrently through the end of the 1980s.

After 33 model years with only minor changes, the final C series trucks were built in 1990. In 1997, production of the Ford Cargo in the US came to an end, as Ford sold the rights to the model line (alongside that of the Ford Louisville/Aeromax) to Freightliner.

== Powertrain ==
Gasoline engines

- Ford 300 cu in (4.9 L) 300 inline-6
- Ford 401, 477, and 534 Super Duty V8
- Ford 292 & 292HD Y-block (1957–1963)
- Ford 330MD/HD, 359XD, 361 & 389XD, 391 cubic inch FT V8 (1964–1978)
- Lincoln 302 and 332 cubic inch Y-Block V8 (1957–1963)
- Ford 370 and 429 cubic inch commercial engines (1979–1990)

Diesel engines

- Caterpillar 1160/3208 V8
- Cummins N Series inline-6
- Cummins C8.3 inline-6
- Ford 6.6L & 7.8L inline-6
- Detroit 8.2L "Fuel Pincher" V8

== Ford H series (1961–1966) ==
In 1961, Ford introduced a variant of the C series in order to move into the Class 8 COE market. Named the H series, this version placed the cab much higher on the chassis; instead of being placed underneath the driver's seat, the front axle was moved forward, directly underneath the driver. With the higher placement of the cab, space was available for a larger grille, visually similar to the N-series conventional trucks which were introduced later. The cab cutouts for the C-series front wheels were turned into underfloor toolboxes and luggage space. It lasted until 1966, when it was replaced by the W-series COE trucks.

== Usage by other manufacturers ==
Some referred to the Ford tilt-cab as the "Budd" cab, implying it was an off-the-shelf item available to anyone. However, the C-series cab was designed by Ford, tooled at its own expense and built by the Budd Company to Ford Motor Company specifications. Other truck manufacturers had to obtain Ford approval before purchasing it. The exception was Mack, which bought most of the major cab stampings from Budd and assembled them itself on a floor pan of its own design. In Canada, the Ford "C" had an identical twin – the Mercury "M" Series offered from 1957 to 1972.

At least four truck makers used the Ford C-series tilt cab. Best known was the look-alike Mack model "N," which was produced between 1958 and 1962. The Four-Wheel-Drive Auto Company used some Ford "C" cabs which bore the FWD emblems, and Yankee-Walter used C series cab components on some of its large airport crash trucks. In Canada, the Thibault fire truck manufacturer of Pierreville, Quebec, also used C series parts for their Custom (i.e., non-commercial chassis) trucks.

== Resources ==
- American Truck & Bus Spotter's Guide: 1920–1985, by Tad Burness.
- Ford Trucks Since 1905, by James K. Wagner.
- Ford Heavy Duty Trucks 1948–1998, by Paul G. McLaughlin.
- Ford Truck Chronicle, by the Auto Editors of the Consumer Guide, with Paul G. McLaughlin.
- Enjine!-Enjine! 2001–2002: "Let's Hear it for the Tilt-Cab Ford." Walter McCall
