= Automotive industry in Massachusetts =

The automotive industry in Massachusetts refers to a period of time from 1893 to 1989 when automobiles were manufactured in the Commonwealth of Massachusetts commercially. In the early years, the state produced more automobiles than Detroit, Michigan. During the 20th century, General Motors and the Ford Motor Company were producing automobiles at the Framingham Assembly and Cambridge Assembly (later moved to the Somerville Assembly), respectively.

== History ==
=== Early years ===
==== Western Massachusetts ====
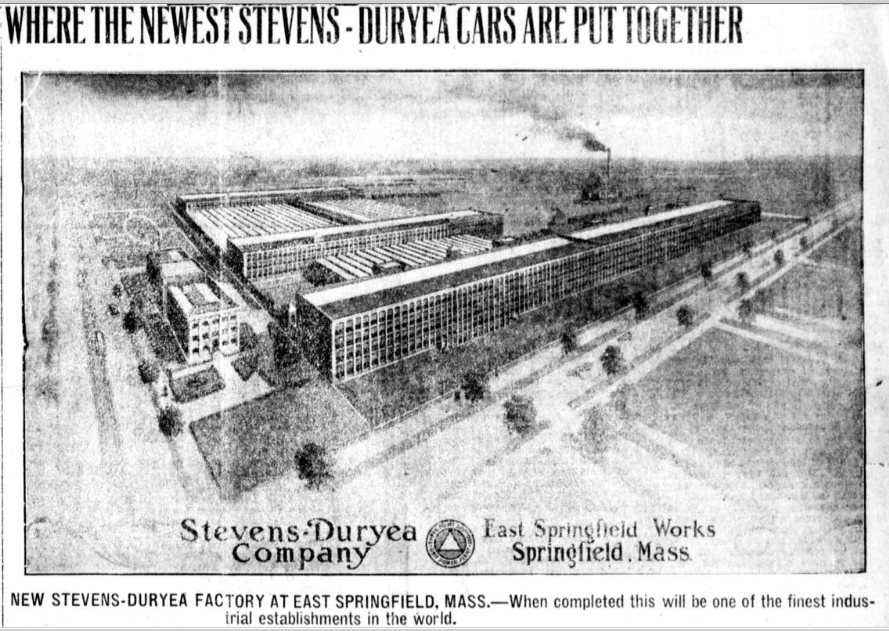
East Springfield Works, during its ownership by Stevens-Duryea

On September 20, 1893, Charles and Frank Duryea of Springfield, Massachusetts, built and then road-tested the first-ever American, gasoline-powered car in Springfield. During these years, many independent manufacturers built automobiles in the state. In 1900, Springfield was joined by Skene, and Knox Automobile, which survived until 1927 as manufacturers of automobiles. In 1905, Knox famously produced America's first motorized fire engines for the Springfield Fire Department—the first modern fire department in the world. Stevens-Duryea also built cars in East Springfield, from 1901 to 1915, and again from 1919 to 1927. After hitting hard times in 1915, the plant was sold to the New England Westinghouse Company in 1915.

In the 1920s, Rolls-Royce America decided to also start manufacturing in the city, stating, "The artisans of Springfield—from long experience in fine precision work—were found to possess the same pride in workmanship as the craftsmen of England." From 1921 until 1931, the company's only foreign plant was located in Springfield, off of Hendee Street. It assembled nearly three thousand Silver Ghosts and Phantoms. The Rolls-Royce factory is adjacent to the former Indian Motorcycle manufacturing plant.

==== Eastern Massachusetts ====
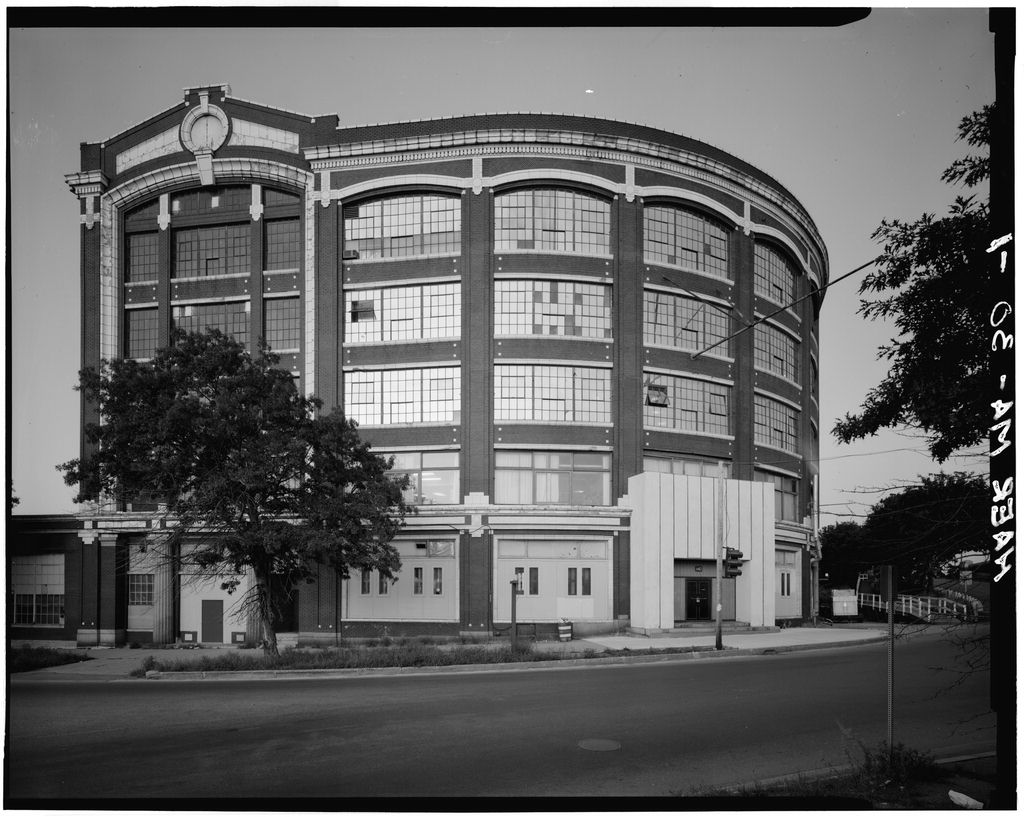
The Cambridge Assembly, date unknown

The H.H. Buffum Company produced the Buffum from 1901 to 1906 in Abington. From 1902-1908, the Waltham Manufacturing Company produced the Orient, until it was reorganized as the Metz Company in 1908. The Crest Manufacturing Company produced the Crestmobile around 1904, although there is no . The Corwin Manufacturing Company manufactured the Gas-au-lec in Peabody between 1905 and 1906. The Pope Manufacturing Company also produced automobiles in Hyde Park, including the Pope-Hartford (1903-1914), Pope-Robinson, Pope-Toledo (1903-1909), Pope-Tribune (1904-1907) and Pope-Waverley.

The Ford Motor Company opened Cambridge Assembly in 1913, and manufactured vehicles there until 1926, when it opened Somerville Assembly.

=== Great Depression and World War II ===
The Great Depression ended up closing many plants nationally. In Springfield, Rolls-Royce America decided to close their plant rather than retool it.

=== Post-war years ===
During the post-war years, manufacturing boomed in the state. General Motors opened Framingham Assembly in 1947. In 1958, Somerville Assembly was closed by Ford, following the failure of the Ford Edsel.

=== End of major manufacturing ===
In 1983, General Motors, decided to idle, then shutter, the Framingham Assembly, citing its small size and issues with town leaders. The plant was later shut down in 1989 (labor contracts prohibited closing the plant until 1990), laying off 2,100 workers, down from a peak of 5,000 from Connecticut, New Hampshire, Rhode Island, and Massachusetts. This brought to an end to commercial car manufacturing in the state.

== See also ==
- Automotive industry in the United States
