= List of former automotive manufacturing plants =

List of former automotive manufacturing plants. The table below lists former automotive industry manufacturing factories and facilities.

== List of plants ==
company and plant title	location	former marques and/or products	year opened	year closed	cultural references	current use
Alfa Romeo Arese Plant	Arese, Milan, Italy	Alfa Romeo	1963	2005		Alfa Romeo museum working there
Alfa Romeo Portello Plant	Milan, Italy	Alfa Romeo	1908	1986		demolished in 2004
American Motors	Kenosha, Wisconsin	Nash, Rambler, Ambassador, Marlin, Javelin/AMX, Matador, Hornet, Gremlin, Pacer, Concord, Spirit, Eagle, Renault Alliance, Chrysler Fifth Avenue/Dodge Diplomat/Plymouth Gran Fury, Dodge Omni/Plymouth Horizon	1902	1988	seen in 1978 film The Betsy	now Harborpark development. Main Plant (engine plant) demolished 2013.
American Motors Brampton Assembly	Brampton, Ontario, Canada	Rambler American; Rambler Classic; AMC Rebel; AMC Hornet/Concord; AMC Gremlin/Spirit; AMC Eagle; Jeep CJ; Jeep Wrangler	1961	1992		Northeast corner of Kennedy Road and Steeles Avenue and operated by American Motors from 1961 to 1992. The plant assembled American Motors and Jeep vehicles until it was closed in 1992. Demolished and now home to Walmart Canada Distribution Centre, Lowe's Home Improvement store and other retails stores.
Aston Martin Aston Martin Works	Newport Pagnell, Milton Keynes, England		1954	July 2007		Former aircraft hangar known as the Olympia. Retained by Aston Martin as a Heritage Showroom.
AutoLatina	Ipiranga, Brazil	Volkswagen & Ford	1987	1995		??
Nash Motors/American Motors El Segundo Plant	El Segundo, California	Nash	1948	1955		Purchased in 1955 by Hughes Aircraft for missile assembly and testing; later passed to General Motors; now Boeing Integration and Test Complex
Bedford Vehicles	Dunstable, England	Bedford Vehicles truck & bus chassis	1942	1992		Sold by GM to AWD in 1982, after losing a key British Army contract. Ceased production in 1992 after bankruptcy of AWD. Redeveloped as a retail park and industrial estate
Bentley Cricklewood factory	Cricklewood, London, England	Bentley	1919	1932		Original home of the firm. Oxgate Centre now stands on the site.
Broadmeadows Assembly Plant	Campbellfield. Victoria, Australia		1959	2016		
Buffalo Assembly	Buffalo, New York		1923	2007		
Automobiles Ettore Bugatti Messier Bugatti	Molsheim, Alsace, France	Pre-war Bugattis	1909	1956		Ceased production of automobiles in favour of aircraft-parts assembly, notably undercarriages and brake systems
Bugatti Automobili La Fabbrica Blu	Campogalliano, Emilia-Romagna, Italy	EB110	1989	23 September 1995		Was sold on to another company who declared bankruptcy before moving in, has since then been left unoccupied.
Chester Assembly	Chester, Pennsylvania		1927	1961		
Chrysler Chrysler Australia Assembly Plant	Clovelly Park, South Australia	Large 6&8 cylinder vehicles	1963	1971		Sold to Mitsubishi Motors (see below)
Chrysler Chrysler Australia Lonsdale Engine Manufacturing plant	Lonsdale, South Australia	Large 6&8 cylinder vehicles	1968	1971		Sold to Mitsubishi Motors Corporation (see below).
Chrysler Corporation Dodge Main Plant	Hamtramck, Michigan with parts overlapping into Detroit, Michigan	Dodge cars	1910	1980-01-04	First plant organized by the United Automobile Workers Union. Home of the League of Revolutionary Black Workers in the 1960s.	Demolished 1981. Land claimed by eminent domain, along with surrounding neighborhoods in both Hamtramck and Detroit, for the creation of the massive "Poletown" plant (General Motors Detroit/Hamtramck Assembly Plant).
Chrysler Kew factory	Kew, London, England	Chrysler, Dodge	c.1921	1967		Site now occupied by Kew Retail Park
Chrysler Los Angeles Plant	5800 Eastern @ Slauson, south-east corner, Los Angeles (Commerce), California	Plymouth Valiant, Plymouth Barracuda, Dodge Dart, Dodge Challenger, Dodge Charger, Belvedere / Coronet	1932	July 1971	Home of month-long strike in 1958	
Chrysler San Leandro Plant	San Leandro, California	Plymouth, 1949–1954; Dodge, 1948–1954	1929	1955	?	Redeveloped into mall
Chrysler Stockton Truck Plant	Stockton, California	Dodge trucks	1926	1933	?	Graham Bros truck plant, acquired by Dodge Bros, closed due to Great Depression.
Chrysler Newark Assembly	Newark, Delaware	Chrysler Aspen, Dodge Durango, K-cars, Dodge Dart, Plymouth Valiant, Chrysler LeBaron/Dodge Diplomat, Dodge Aspen/Plymouth Volare, other Plymouth and Dodge models	1957	2008	?	Purchased by University of Delaware, being redeveloped as a Science and Technology Campus for the school.
Citroën Paris factory	Paris, France		1919	1970s		Site converted into a public park, the Parc André Citroën.
Citroën Slough factory	Slough, England		1926	1965		Site now being redeveloped. Citroën retains its UK headquarters in Slough.
Fiat Corso Dante	Turin, Italy		1900	?		?
Fiat Poughkeepsie	Poughkeepsie, New York, USA		1908	1918		Plant torn down in the late 1990s, currently a shopping plaza, housing a Home Depot and other stores
Fiat Lingotto Factory	Lingotto, Turin, Italy	Fiat Topolino	1923	1982	Appeared in Mafioso and The Italian Job. Also hosted the Turin Auto Show	Reopened in 1989 as a public space
Fiat Termini Imerese	Termini Imerese, Sicily, Italy	Fiat 126, Fiat Panda 1st gen, Fiat Punto, Lancia Ypsilon 2nd gen	1970	2011		Sold to Chery, then Blutec
Ford Mack Avenue Plant	Detroit, Michigan		1903	1941		
Ford Motor Company St. Thomas Assembly	St. Thomas, Ontario, Canada	Produced 8 million vehicles, including the Ford Pinto, Maverick, Falcon, Panther, Fairmont, EXP, and Crown Vic.	1967	2011		The plant had been largely demolished by the end of 2016, with only the wastewater treatment facility left standing as of Feb. 2017.
Ford Columbus Assembly Plant	Columbus, Ohio		1914	1939		
Ford Edgewater Assembly Plant	Edgewater, New Jersey		1930	1955		
Ford St. Louis Assembly Plant	Hazelwood, Missouri	Mercury Mountaineer, Ford Explorer, Lincoln Aviator	1948	2006		Being redeveloped into a light industrial/commercial park known as Aviator Business Park
Ford Mahwah Assembly	Mahwah, New Jersey	Edsel (1958), Ford Galaxie, Ford LTD, Ford Granada, Ford Fairmont, Mercury Monarch, Mercury Zephyr, Lincoln Versailles	1955	1980	Referenced in "Johnny 99", a Bruce Springsteen song	Sharp Corporation Offices and Sheraton Crossroads Hotel Complex
Ford Highland Park Plant	Highland Park, Michigan	Model T, Fordson tractors, M4A3 Sherman tanks (1942–1943)	1910		First factory in history to assemble cars on a moving assembly line	In 2013, the Woodward Avenue Action Association had a purchase agreement with the complex's owner, National Equity Corp., to redevelop two of eight buildings as a historic center.
Ford Edison Assembly	Edison, New Jersey	Ford Mustang, Pinto, Falcon, Escort, Ranger pickup, Mazda B-series	1948	2004		Being redeveloped as Edison Towne Square, a mixed use retail development. Current tenants include a Sam's Club.
Ford Norfolk Assembly	Norfolk, Virginia	Ford F150	1925	2007		Redeveloped into a warehouse for logistics company Katoen Natie
Ford Wixom Assembly Plant	Wixom, Michigan	Lincoln Town Car, Continental, Mark series, Lincoln LS, Ford Thunderbird	1957	2007		Idled as of May 31, 2007, demolition began in January 2013. A Menards home improvement store now sits on the site.
Ford Twin Cities Assembly Plant	St. Paul, Minnesota	Ford Ranger	1925	2011		Being demolished and expected to be redeveloped to be part of the surrounding residential and commercial neighborhood.
Ford Dallas Assembly Plant	Dallas, Texas	Model T	1913	1924		Located at 2700 Canton Street. Replaced by East Grand Avenue plant in 1925, became Adam Hats Co. Now known as the Adam Hats Building, redeveloped as loft apartments
Ford Dallas Assembly Plant	Dallas, Texas	Ford light trucks	1925	1970	"Made in Texas by Texans" stickers	Located at 5200 East Grand Avenue. Redeveloped by "City Warehouse LP", with retail/commercial tenants
Ford Ford Motor Company Assembly Plant	Atlanta, Georgia		1915	1942		
Ford Atlanta Assembly	Hapeville, Georgia	Ford Taurus, Mercury Sable	1947	2006		Being redeveloped by the Jacoby group as Aerotropolis Atlanta. Part of the site is home to Porsche Cars North America's Headquarters and Experience Center.
Ford Canton Forge	3707 Georgetown Road NE, Canton OH 44704 Canton, Ohio	Forged axles, ring gears, spindles, steering systems for Ford Mustangs, Lincoln Town Cars, and others	1948	December 23, 1988		Partially used as Republic Engineered Products' Canton Bloom Cast Facility
Ford Motor Company Lorain Assembly Plant	Lorain, Ohio	Ford E-Series (1961–2005); Ford F-Series (1958–1965); Ford Ranchero (1958–1979); Ford Gran Torino (1971–1976); Ford Thunderbird (1977–1997); Mercury Cougar (1977–1997)	1958	2005		
Ford Somerville Assembly	Somerville, Massachusetts	Edsel		1958		Redeveloped as the Assembly Square Mall in the 1980s after brief use as a supermarket distribution center.
Ford Cambridge Assembly	Cambridge, Massachusetts	Model T	1913	1926		Polaroid bought it and used it for manufacturing. MIT currently owns the property and has renovated it as office space.
Ford Dearborn Assembly Plant	Dearborn, Michigan	Ford Mustang	1918			6.7 Mustangs built at plant, production moved to AutoAlliance plant in Flat Rock, Mich. (started 09-07-2004). Plant originally built to build Eagle boats called submarine chasers. Ford Model A, Ford Thunderbird and Mercury Cougar were also built at plant
Ford Motor Company Willow Run Plant	Ypsilanti, Michigan	B-24 Liberator Aircraft	World War II	passed to Kaiser and General Motors after WWII	"Largest room in the world"; see article	Willow Run Airport and General Motors manufacturing facility
Ford Motor Company Terminal Island Plant	Terminal Island, Long Beach, California	Ford Model A	1930s	1959	Henry Ford Bridge provided only link to Terminal Island for decades	Part of the Port of Los Angeles complex
Ford Motor Company Long Beach Plant	Long Beach, California	Ford Model A	1930	1959		
Ford Motor Company Pico Rivera Plant	Rosemead & Washington Boulevards, Pico Rivera, California	1.4 million automobiles	c. 1959	January 1980	Purchased by Northrop Grumman in February 1982, the 2,000,000-square-foot (190,000 m^{2}) plant went on to be the home of the B-2 bomber.	Closed and demolished (2001); now a large retail center, anchored by Wal-Mart and Lowes.
Ford Ford Richmond Plant	Richmond, California	Various models, WWII tanks and armored vehicles	1930	1956	?	Opened in 1930 and closed 1956 - Renovated, now part of Rosie the Riveter National Historical Park
Ford San Jose Assembly Plant	Milpitas, California	Ford Mustang/Shelby Mustang/Ford Falcon/Mercury Cougar	1955	1984	?	Opened in 1955 and closed 1984 - redeveloped into the Great Mall of the Bay Area in 1994
Ford Ford Trafford Park Factory	Trafford Park, Manchester, England	Ford Model T	1911	1928	?	
Ford Australia Homebush Plant	Homebush, New South Wales	Ford Laser	1936	1994	?	
Ford Southampton plant	Southampton		1939	2013		
General Motors Buick City Plant	Hamilton St., Flint, Michigan	Buick LeSabre, Buick Electra, Buick Special, Buick Regal	1904	1999		Demolished
General Motors Reatta Craft Centre/Lansing Craft Centre	Lansing, Michigan	Buick Reatta, GM EV1, Chevrolet SSR, Cadillac Eldorado, Chevrolet Cavalier and Pontiac Sunfire convertibles	1988	2006-03-17	?	?
General Motors St. Louis Truck Assembly Plant	St. Louis, Missouri	Chevrolet & GMC trucks, 1954–1981 Corvette, Chevy II/Nova	1920s	1986	?	?
General Motors Fisher Body Plant 1	S. Saginaw St., Flint, Michigan	Bodies for Chevrolet models	?	?	?	Partially demolished; Remaining portion now Great Lakes Technology Center
General Motors Wilmington Assembly Plant	801 Boxwood Road, Wilmington, Delaware	Chevrolet Beretta (1987–1996); Pontiac Solstice, Saturn Sky	Ground broken 1945; Opened 1947	2009-07-29	Last auto manufacturing plant in Delaware. Last auto manufacturing plant in the Northeastern United States	Demolished and being redeveloped as an Amazon Fulfillment Center.
General Motors South Gate Assembly	2700 Tweedy Blvd., South Gate, California	?	1936	1982	?	Sold to City of South Gate in 1985, redeveloped as South East High School
General Motors Oakland Assembly	Oakland, California	Chevrolet cars and trucks	1916	c.1963	?	Production was moved to Fremont Assembly Plant in Fremont, California, which later became the site of NUMMI, GM's joint venture with Toyota and the only major auto assembly plant remaining in California. Not to be confused with Oakland, Pontiac's original parent marque.
General Motors Fremont Assembly	Fremont, California	Chevrolet cars and trucks	1963	1984	?	Operated as GM plant from 1963 to 1982, then became the site of NUMMI, GM's joint venture with Toyota and the only major auto assembly plant remaining in California. Closed April 1, 2010, partially reopening as the Tesla Factory, an automobile assembly plant for Tesla Motors
General Motors Detroit Assembly (also known as Detroit Cadillac or Clark Street Assembly)	Clark Street, Detroit, Michigan	Cadillac models; Oldsmobile 88 and Custom Cruiser; Chevrolet Caprice and Impala.	1921	1987	?	Redeveloped as multi-tenant industrial park, within Federal Empowerment Zone
General Motors Norwood Assembly Plant	Norwood, Ohio	Chevrolet Bel Air, Biscayne, Impala, Nova, Caprice, and Camaro, Pontiac Firebird, Buick Apollo	1923	1987	?	Redeveloped after lengthy court battle between city of Norwood and General Motors; see article
General Motors Framingham Assembly Plant	Framingham, Massachusetts	See article	1948	1989	?	ADESA automobile, truck, and boat warehouse and live auction site
General Motors Janesville Assembly	Janesville, Wisconsin	GMC Yukon, Chevrolet Suburban Originally Janesville Tractor Co(GM acquisition) factory. Was oldest car factory in USA.	1919	2008-12-23	?	Plant has been demolished
General Motors Lakewood Assembly Plant	Atlanta, Georgia (Lakewood)	Chevrolet trucks, Chevrolet Caprice	1927	1990	?	Demolished to the slab. Largely undeveloped except for a small parcel used by a waste management company.
General Motors Pontiac Assembly Plant	Pontiac, Michigan	Pontiac Fiero (1984–1988)	1927	1988	?	?
General Motors Regina Plant	Regina, Saskatchewan, Canada	Buick, Chevrolet (Maple Leaf), Oldsmobile, Pontiac	1928	1941	?	Used by several tenants for commercial purposes.
General Motors Scarborough Van Assembly Plant	Scarborough, Ontario (present-day Toronto)	G-series vans, GMC Vandura, Chevy Sportvan, GMC Handi-Van	1963	1993	?	Operations moved to Flint Truck Assembly. Plant demolished and now site of retail mall (Eglinton Town Centre)
General Motors Willow Run Assembly Plant	Ypsilanti, Michigan	Chevrolet Caprice	1959	1994	?	Vehicle assembly ceased in 1994; also at the Willow Run site, GM Powertrain operated Hydramatic Transmission Plant (1953–2007, then Ypsilanti Transmission Operations 2007–2010).
General Motors North Tarrytown Assembly	North Tarrytown, New York (now Sleepy Hollow, New York)	Minivans, including Lumina APV; see article	1896 by Maxwell-Briscoe; 1903 by Ingersoll-Rand; 1914 by Chevrolet, later acquired by GM	1996	?	Redevelopment
General Motors Baltimore Assembly Plant	Baltimore, Maryland	GMC Safari, Chevrolet Astro	1935	2005	?	Purchased by Duke Realty. Being redeveloped as an industrial park known as the Chesapeake Commerce Center.
General Motors Lansing Car Assembly	Lansing, Michigan	Pontiac Grand Am, Chevrolet Malibu, Oldsmobile Alero	1902/1920	2005	Harbour Consulting rated it as the sixth most efficient auto plant in North America in 2006, after its closure (see article)	Demolished 2007
General Motors Oklahoma City Assembly	Oklahoma City, Oklahoma (2006)	GM X platform, GMT360 Platform	1979	2006	?	Purchased by the voters of Oklahoma County for lease to Tinker Air Force Base
Frigidaire Plant; General Motors Moraine Assembly Plant	Moraine, Ohio	Chevrolet S-10, GMC S-15, GMT360 Platform SUVs	1951	2008	Workers represented by IUE-CWA, not the United Auto Workers	Purchased by Fuyao Glass America in 2014 and reopened in 2015 as an automotive glass manufacturing plant.
General Motors Doraville Assembly Plant	Doraville, Georgia	Oldsmobile Cutlass Supreme (1988–1995), Chevrolet Venture (1997–2005), Pontiac Trans Sport / Pontiac Trans Sport (1997–2005), Oldsmobile Silhouette (1997–2004), Buick Terraza (2005–2007), Saturn Relay (2005–2007), Chevrolet Uplander (2005–2009), Pontiac Montana SV6 (2005–2009), Buick GL8	1947	2008-09-25		Being redeveloped as a mixed commercial/residential space known as Assembly Yards.
General Motors Linden Assembly	Linden, New Jersey	Oldsmobiles, Pontiacs, Buicks Chevrolet S-10 Blazer, GMC Jimmy, GMC Truck and Bus Division	1937	2005		Purchased by Duke Realty. Being redeveloped as an industrial park known as the Legacy Commerce Center.
General Motors Chevrolet-Pontiac-Canada Division Van Nuys Assembly Plant	Van Nuys, California	Chevrolet Corvair, Chevrolet Nova, Chevrolet Camaro, Pontiac Firebird.	1947	1992		Redeveloped as The Plant shopping center. GM maintains a test track adjacent to the shopping center.
General Motors Sainte-Thérèse Assembly	Sainte-Thérèse, Quebec	Chevrolet Camaro, Pontiac Firebird, Oldsmobile Cutlass, Chevrolet Vega, Pontiac Trans Am, Pontiac Bonneville, Pontiac LeMans	1966	2002		Redeveloped as a mixed commercial/residential space known as Faubourg Boisbriand.
General Motors Canada Oshawa Truck Assembly	Oshawa, Ontario	Chevrolet Silverado, GMC Sierra, Chevrolet C/K pickup trucks	1965	2009-05-14		Site is part of GM Oshawa Autoplex, where the Oshawa Car plant continues operations.
Genk Body & Assembly	Genk		1964	2014		
Grand Blanc Metal Center	Grand Blanc, Michigan		1942	2013		
Holden Holden Elizabeth Plant	Elizabeth, South Australia		1963	2017		
Holden Holden Fishermans Bend Plant	Fishermans Bend		1936	2016		
Holden Holden Dandenong Plant	Dandenong, Victoria		1956	1988		
Holden Holden Acacia Ridge Plant	Acacia Ridge, Queensland		1966	1984		Site now a grocery.
Holden Holden Pagewood Plant	Pagewood, New South Wales		1940	1981		Site now the offices of British American Tobacco in Sydney.
Holden Woodville plant	Woodville, South Australia		1924	1984		Site now occupied by the Charles Sturt Industrial Estate.
Honda Swindon plant	Swindon, Wiltshire, UK		1985	30 July 2021		
Hyundai Bromont Plant	Bromont, Quebec, Canada	Hyundai Sonata	1989	1993		
IMA - Industria de Montagem Automovel	Setúbal, Portugal	Mini, Mini IMA, Mini Moke, Austin/Morris J4 and AJ6, Morris Marina	1961	1984		Industrial Park
Inland Fisher Guide Plant	West Trenton, New Jersey		1938	1998		
Jaguar Browns Lane plant	Coventry, England	Jaguar	1951	2005		Assembly halls demolished. Small part retained as the Jaguar Museum until 2012, until its subsequent demolition. Site now occupied by a housing estate.
Lago Alberto Assembly	Miguel Hidalgo, Mexico City		1930s	2002		
Lansing Metal Center	Lansing, Michigan		1952	2006		
Leeds Assembly	Leeds, Missouri		1929	1988		
Lynch Road Assembly	Detroit		1928	1981		
Massena Castings Plant	Massena, New York		1959	2009		
MG Rover Group Longbridge plant	Longbridge, Birmingham, England	Austin, Rover, Morris, MG, Mini, Triumph, Nash/Rambler Metropolitan	1904	2005	Featured in the music video of The Chemical Brothers song, Believe	Large amounts demolished, small scale production has restarted with the MG brand.
Matra L'usine Normant	Romorantin-Lanthenay, France			2003		The plant was demolished. Main entrance attained listed building status and has been preserved and restored.
Mitsubishi Motors Corporation Mitsubishi Motors Australia Assembly Plant	Clovelly Park, South Australia	Various small and mid-sized vehicles	1971	2008		Site now occupied by Flinders University, Siemens and TAFE. Skeleton structure of Main Assembly Building remains.
Mitsubishi Motors Mitsubishi Motors Australia Lonsdale Engine Manufacturing plant	Lonsdale, South Australia	Various small and mid-sized vehicles	1971	2008		Site now occupied by Onkaparinga Recycling plant.
Nissan Motors Zama plant	Zama, Kanagawa, Japan		1965	1995		currently Global Production Engineering Center and Nissan Heritage Collection, a storage unit for its historic models
Opel Bochum plant	Bochum, Germany	Opel (General Motors)	1963	2014		Demolished except for the administration building, which is to be preserved.
Packard Automotive Plant, Detroit	East Grand Boulevard and Concord Avenue Detroit, Michigan	Packard	1907	1956	?	(From 1960) Subdivided as industrial park (Present day) Urban ruins
Pan Motor Company Office and Sheet Metal Works	St Cloud, Minnesota		1919	1922		
Peugeot Ryton plant	Ryton-on-Dunsmore, near Coventry, England	Rootes, later Chrysler and finally Peugeot	1939	2006		Demolished in 2007.
Peugeot and Citroën PSA Aulnay-sous-Bois Plant	Aulnay-sous-Bois, France	Citroën, Peugeot	1972	2014		
Pilette Road Truck Assembly	Windsor, Ontario		1974	2003		
Pittsburgh Metal	Pittsburgh		1948	2008		
Renault	Setúbal, Portugal	Renault 5, Renault 4, Renault Clio	1977	1998		Business Park
Renault Billancourt factory	Paris, France		1934	1992		The plant was demolished in 2005 and the site is now being redeveloped.
Renault Park Royal factory	Acton, London, England		1926	1960		Site still owned by Renault, now used as showrooms
Rootes Group Linwood plant	Linwood, Scotland	Rootes, later Chrysler and finally Peugeot	1961	1981	Mentioned in Letter from America by The Proclaimers	Demolished in 1982.
Saint Louis Assembly	Fenton, Missouri		1959	2009		
Shreveport Operations	Shreveport, Louisiana		1981	2012		
Standard Canley factory	Canley, Coventry, England	Standard, Triumph	1918	1980		Demolished, and site redeveloped for housing and business. A sculpture of the Standard logo now stands to remind people where the factory was.
Studebaker Corporation, South Bend	Chippewa Avenue South Bend, Indiana	Studebaker	18??	1963	?	(From 1964) Assembly facilities taken over by Kaiser Jeep (Present day) Other uses, partially demolished and urban ruins
Studebaker Corporation, New York, New York	615 West 131st St Manhattanville, New York City	Studebaker	1923	1937	?	(From 1937) Borden Milk processing plant (Present day) Columbia University finance department building
Vauxhall Motors Luton plant	Luton, England	Vauxhall	1905	2002		Vauxhall's main assembly plant. Demolished and site now being redeveloped
Volkswagen of America Volkswagen Westmoreland Assembly Plant	New Stanton, Pennsylvania	Rabbit/Golf, Caddy, Jetta	1978	1988	The facility was originally built by Chrysler in the 1960s, but was not completed until VW began operations.	Sony took over the site in 1990 and began production of televisions from 1990 to 2008. Production continued in Puebla, Mexico and US VW production resumed in 2011 at the Chattanooga Assembly Plant
Volkswagen of America Sterling Heights Assembly	Sterling Heights, Michigan	N/A	1953	1983	The facility was originally built to manufacture jet engines and was operated as the Michigan Ordnance Missile Plant by the U.S. Army. Acquired by Volkswagen in 1980 and converted to automobile production.	Chrysler took over the site in 1983 and began production of their own vehicles. Still in use by Chrysler today.
Volvo Volvo Kalmar Assembly	Kalmar		1974	1994		
Volvo Volvo Halifax Assembly Plant	Halifax, Nova Scotia, Canada	Volvo PV544, 120, 240, 740, 940, 850, S70, V70 and S80	1963	1998-12-18	Volvo's only car assembly plant in North America.	Volvo Halifax Assembly - Bayer's Lake Plant still stands and is now used as an office complex.
Volvo Chesapeake Plant	Volvo Parkway & Greenbriar Parkway, Chesapeake, Virginia	Volvo B10M and other transit buses (Plant originally planned for cars)	Ground broken 1974-07-02	1986-10	One of the first foreign-owned automotive manufacturing plants in the U.S., soon followed by Volkswagen and others.	Volvo Penta Marine retains facilities in the area. Redeveloped as "Crossways Commerce Center" shopping center.
Willow Run Transmission	Ypsilanti Township, Michigan		1953	2010		
Ford Antwerp Assembly	Antwerp, Belgium	Ford motor, Ford tractor, New Holland	?	1964		Original plant was on Rue Dubois from 1922 to 1926. Ford then moved to the Hoboken District of Antwerp in 1926 until they moved to a plant near the Bassin Canal in 1931. Replaced by the Genk plant that opened in 1964 however tractors were then made at Antwerp for some time after car & truck production ended. Is now a driveline production facility for New Holland tractor.
company and plant title	location	former marques and/or products	year opened	year closed	cultural references	current use

== See also ==
- List of automobile manufacturers
- Brownfield land
- Ford Piquette Avenue Plant
- Flint, Michigan auto industry
- List of GM factories
- List of Volkswagen Group factories
