= Naval Landing Force Equipment Depot =

Naval Landing Force Equipment Depot may refer to:

- Naval Landing Force Equipment Depot (Albany, California), after World War II, this facility became Golden Gate Fields
- Naval Landing Force Equipment Depot (Norfolk, Virginia) (1942–1946), facilities purchased by Ford Motor Company and became the Norfolk Assembly after World War II
