= Skene (automobile) =

Defunct American motor vehicle manufacturer

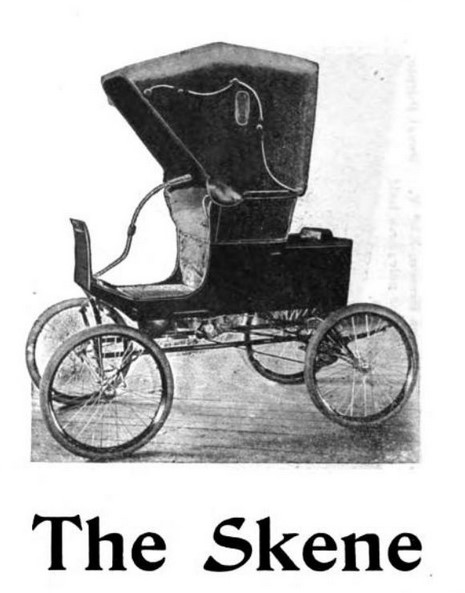
- Skene Steamer from advertisement

Overview
- Type: Steam car
- Manufacturer: Skene American Automobile Company
- Production: 1900–1901
- Designer: James W. Skene

The Skene was an American automobile manufactured from 1900 to 1901. A twin-cylinder 5-hp steam car, it was built in Lewiston, Maine.

== History ==
J. W. Skene Cycle Company of Lewiston finished its first steam carriage in 1900. R. H. B. Warburton of Springfield, Massachusetts helped Skene organize, with a capital stock of $500,000, the Skene American Automobile Company. Company headquarters were in Springfield, the factory remained in Maine.

The Skene was a simple steam buggy with a 5-hp double-acting two-cylinder engine and had a boiler with a working pressure of 160 pounds. The gasoline and water tanks were sufficient for a 25-mile run. All parts of the Skene were built in the Lewiston plant, a fact in which the Skene company took pride. Prices ran from a Model 1 Steam Stanhope at $750 (equivalent to $29,025 in 2025) to a Model 5 Canopy Steam Surrey at $1,300, equivalent to $50,310 in 2025.

By January 1901, Skene had a production run of twenty cars, and Warburton arranged a large display at the Philadelphia Automobile Show that month. This didn’t work out as planned. As The Motor Age magazine put it, "a miscalculation on the part of the railroad officials tied up four Skene machines somewhere between Springfield and Philadelphia, and a space big enough to comfortably exhibit half a dozen vehicles looked bare with but one."

Later in 1901, Skene reported 125 vehicles under construction but the partners’ money ran out. Sometime that spring the Skene American Automobile Company was attached for $5,000 by creditors. James Skene subsequently became a Rambler dealer, and spent the rest of his life in the automobile business in Maine.

Advertisements

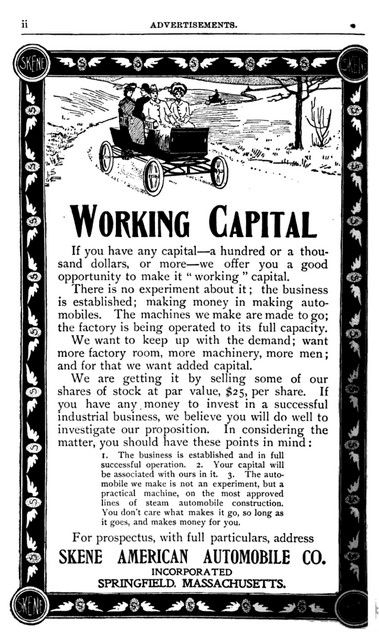
Skene Steamer advertisement in 1900 Black Cat magazine

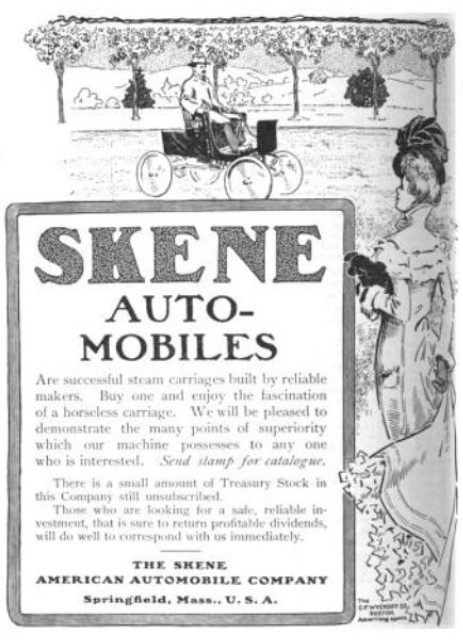
Skene advertisement in the Feb 1901 Saturday Evening Post
