= Assembly Square =

Neighborhood in Somerville, Massachusetts, U.S.

- Neighborhood
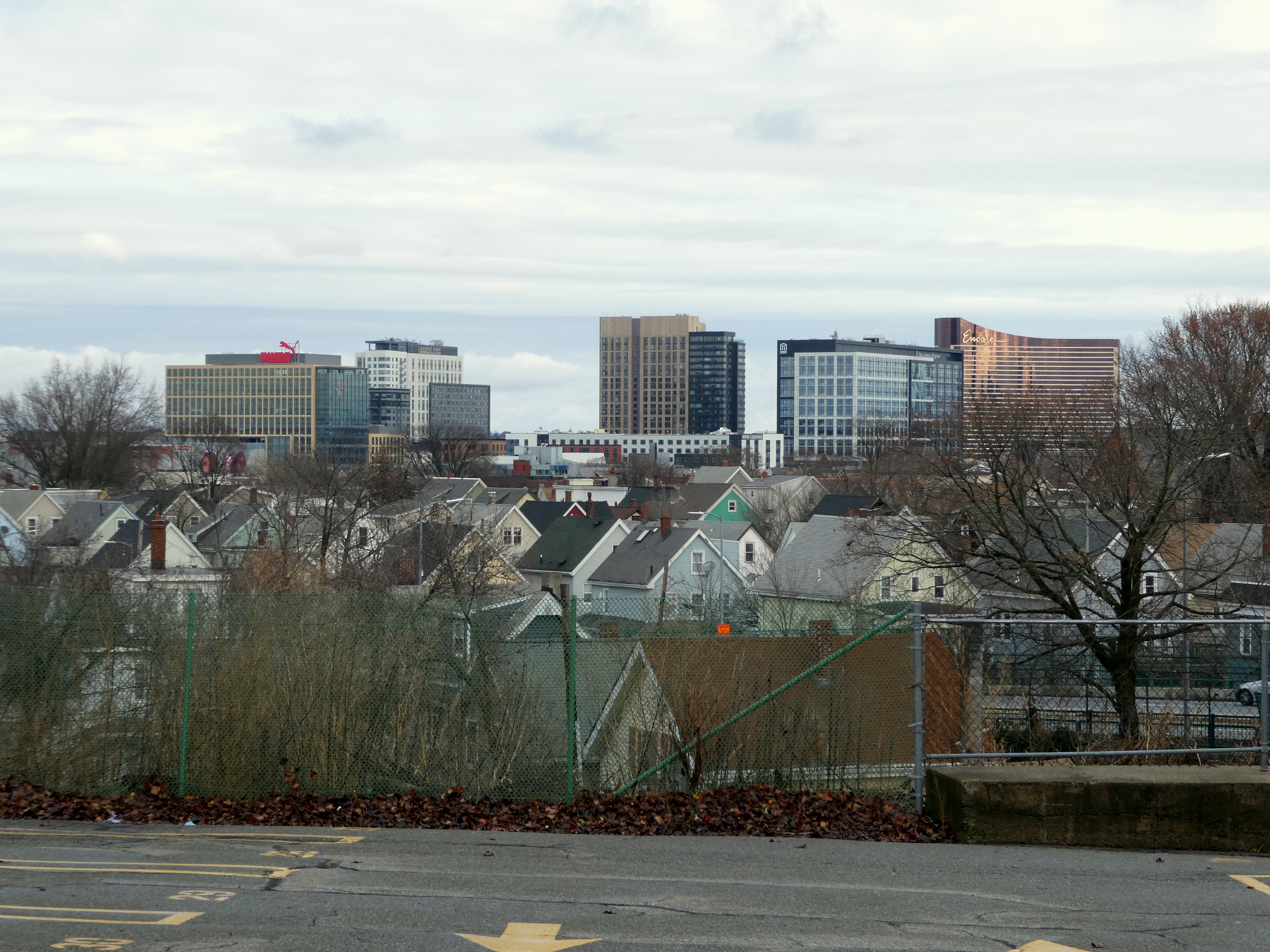
- Assembly Square's skyline as viewed from Somerville's Spring Hill neighborhood in 2021
- Interactive map of Assembly Square
- Coordinates: 42°23′35″N 71°04′50″W
- Country: United States
- State/Province: Massachusetts
- County: Middlesex
- City: Somerville
- Opened: 1981

Area
  - Total: 50 acres (20 ha)
- ZIP Code: 02145
- Area code: 617/857

Assembly Square is a neighborhood in Somerville, Massachusetts, United States. It is located along the west bank of the Mystic River, bordered by Ten Hills and Massachusetts Route 28 to the north and the Charlestown neighborhood of Boston to the south. The district's western border runs along Interstate 93. Located 2.5 mi (4.0 km) from downtown Boston, the 143 acres (580,000 m^{2}) parcel is named for a former Ford Motor Company plant that closed in 1958.

The area is home to Assembly Row, a 45-acre (180,000 m^{2}) mixed-use, smart growth development that broke ground in April 2012 and opened in 2014 saddling a main street of the same name. It includes retail outlets, restaurants, residential space, office and research and development space, a 12-screen cinema and a 200-room hotel. Other amenities include a marina, a revitalized waterfront park, bike paths and other green space.

The area lies on the junction of Interstate 93 and Massachusetts Route 28, and is served by public transit via the MBTA's Orange Line Assembly station and bus route 90.

== History ==
=== Early use ===
In the 17th century, the southern bank of the Mystic River, a low-lying tidal marsh and wetlands area bordered by uplands further south in the current Ten Hills neighborhood, was avoided by the early settlers because of poorly draining clay soils. The highland site on Ten Hills offered better agricultural land and the first Governor of Massachusetts, John Winthrop, chose it for the site of his farmstead. The location of the Ten Hills site on the Mystic River made it a natural choice for the transport of people and goods, and the first seagoing vessel built in this region was launched from there.

Trade and transport led to an expansion of the area’s economy and population. The construction of the Middlesex Canal at the end of the 18th century accelerated this process. By the early 1800s, there were 10 shipyards along the Mystic River. The area had developed into a transportation corridor from Boston to the region. At mid-century, rail surpassed the canal as the most efficient mode of transport and the construction of two railroads across Somerville in 1845 and 1854, along with the opening of a station at Sullivan Square, brought even more development to the area.

=== Industrial development ===
It was not until the construction of the McGrath Highway in 1925 that full industrial development, albeit short-lived, took hold in Somerville. The Ford Motor Company built an assembly plant here in 1926, which would, over time, lend Assembly Square its name. Additionally, the Boston and Maine Railroad also owned large tracts of land in the district and the land was criss-crossed by spur tracks. With both road and rail connections, the strong transportation infrastructure was a major draw, and other industries soon followed, including First National Stores, a retail supermarket chain, which opened a grocery manufacturing and distribution center in the area.

Within the next 30 years, Assembly Square remained one of the largest employment centers in the region. However, in 1958, as a result of the failure of the Edsel Division of the Ford Motor Company and the change in Ford’s manufacturing strategies, the Assembly Plant was closed. It hurt the area both economically and physically, taking away hundreds of jobs and leaving a vast complex of empty manufacturing buildings. First National moved into the Assembly Plant site shortly after Ford's departure.

By the late 1950s and early 1960s, industries were already making the choice to move to suburban locations along newly constructed highways, where land costs were lower. The construction of the elevated Northern Expressway portion of Interstate 93 in the 1970s segregated the uses on both sides of the highway and significantly reduced its access and visibility from the surrounding areas. In 1976, First National moved its operations from the site to Windsor Locks, Connecticut, marking the end of Assembly Square as a major industrial employment center.

=== Redevelopment ===
Following the closure of First National, the City of Somerville purchased the land and later declared it blighted, adopting the "Assembly Square Revitalization Plan," a 20-year urban renewal plan, in an effort to assist in redevelopment. Under the direction of the plan, the area’s focus began to shift to retail, the cornerstone of which was the rehabilitation of the former auto assembly plant into a retail mall, Assembly Square Mall. The 50-acre project was to be headed by local firm East Bay Development Corporation, and broke ground in September 1978. The shopping center opened 1981 with over 360,000 sq ft (33,000 m^{2}) of retail space, and Kmart and Jordan Marsh as anchors. It was like many smaller “dumbbell” style malls of its era, with an anchor at each end of the mall and a straight hallway between, and a food court in the center. A six-screen movie theater and a four-story office building were also built on the site. Two new roadways, Assembly Square Drive and New Road, were constructed to improve access.

Despite a lack of a cohesive master plan and funding, Assembly took a big step with the arrival of a Home Depot on 11 acres (4.5 ha; 0.017 sq mi) in 1992 at a site next to the mall, bringing a big-box store to the area for the first time. At the mall, the anchor stores remained the same until 1996 when Macy's acquired the Jordan Marsh chain and shuttered the store in 1997. By 1999, the mall had been closed off except for Kmart and Building 19, which had the year prior moved into the old Macy's/Jordan Marsh space.

In 1998, Mystic View Task Force, a citizens group, was formed to advocate for community interests in future Assembly projects. A vision emerged from the forum, of a pedestrian-oriented mixed-use development that could provide 30 additional acres of usable open space, over 30,000 diverse jobs, and over $30 million in new net tax revenue. Mystic View presented evidence that, developed as an office-based neighborhood with supporting retail and housing, Assembly Square could easily achieve those goals. But in order to do that, big-box behemoths — which had dominated much of the Assembly discussion — could not be an option.

In 1999, the internationally known Swedish home furnishings store IKEA purchased two former industrial sites on the Mystic River waterfront. IKEA obtained permits for its proposed retail store; however, the permits were challenged in court by community members opposed to a "big box" use on the waterfront, with the result that redevelopment of the site was stalled for a number of years.

=== Smart growth development ===
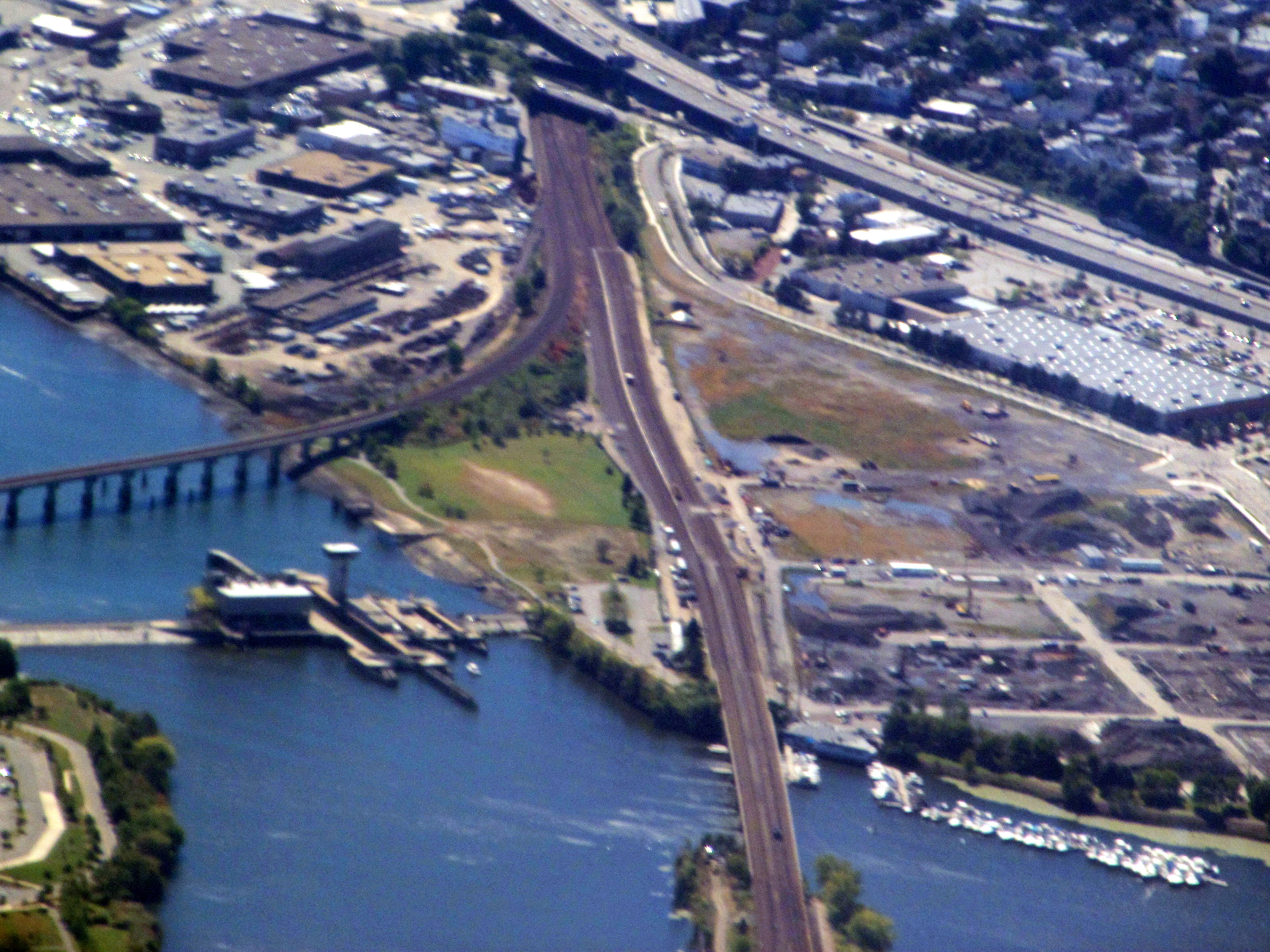
Aerial photo of Assembly Square during its redevelopment in 2012

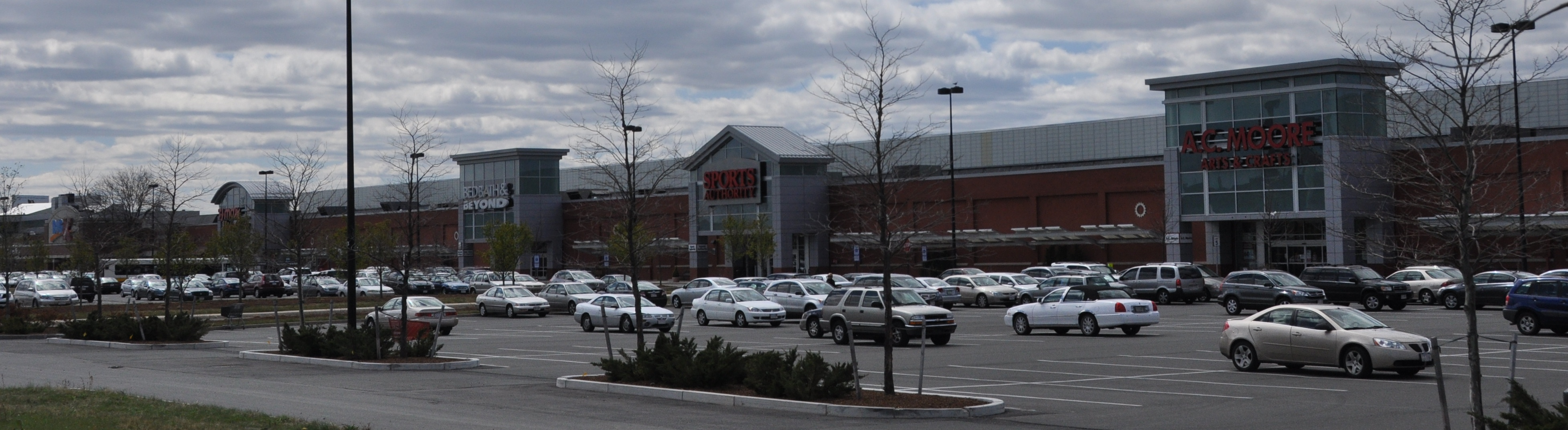
View of the Assembly Square Marketplace in 2012

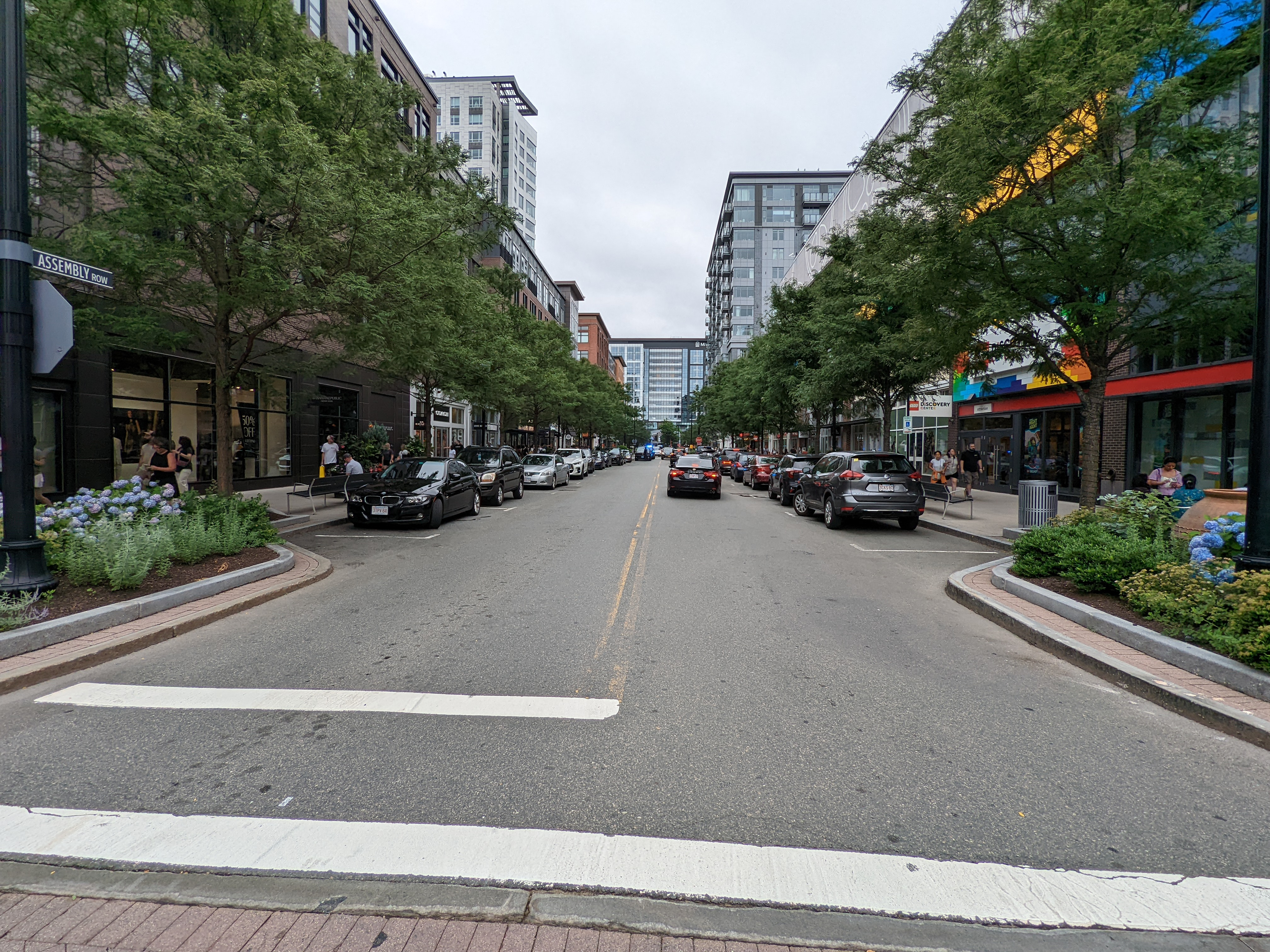
Assembly Row, the neighborhood's central artery, pictured in 2024

In 2000, the Somerville Redevelopment Authority (SRA) acquired title to a 9.3-acre former railroad parcel in Assembly Square and issued an RFP for developers. At the same time, the City initiated an extensive public planning process, producing the "2000 Planning Study" which set out a new vision for Assembly Square as a 24-hour mixed use district with residential, retail, office, cinema, restaurant, hotel, and recreational open space uses. In 2002, the SRA and the City adopted a 20-year extension of the urban renewal plan with the goal of transforming Assembly Square into the mixed-use district described in the 2000 Planning Study. Assembly Square was rezoned to promote the mixed-use concept, and design guidelines and a design review committee were created to provide additional assistance.

In 2005, Federal Realty Investment Trust (FRIT), a Maryland-based real estate investment trust and developer, purchased the defunct Assembly Square Mall along with other properties in Assembly Square. FRIT quickly redeveloped the existing mall into the Assembly Square Marketplace.

Later in 2006, Somerville Mayor Joseph Curtatone aided in bringing FRIT and IKEA together to come up with a feasible redevelopment plan consistent with the new vision. FRIT and IKEA agreed to trade parcels, moving IKEA inland from its initial site and leaving the waterfront open for FRIT to create pedestrian friendly, mixed-use development. The new plan, developed by Street-Works Studio LLC for Federal Realty, integrated residential, office, retail and open space across the site and embraced the waterfront for public use and a future transit stop. Street-Works Studio worked with project-wide consultants to ensure phasing, retail connectedness, developed design guidelines, and brought an important human-scale aesthetic to the project, thinking of the "whole" and every user experience, not just on a block by block basis. This new plan was welcomed by those who had previously opposed the IKEA development. The land swap was executed in October 2009 solidifying the vision of the district.

After more than a decade of planning, IKEA formally pulled out of the Assembly Square project in July 2012, stating that its Stoughton store was sufficient to serve the state. The next year, it was announced that FRIT would purchase the 12 acres (49,000 m^{2}) from IKEA. This sale means that FRIT owns nearly all of the property at Assembly Square.

After two years of preparing the former brownfields site, the ground was broken in April 2012 for two residential apartment blocks, a new main street, and a new MBTA transit infill station. The apartment buildings, the Avalon at Assembly Square (195 units) and AVA Somerville (253 units), are designed by Elkus Manfredi Architects and developed by AvalonBay Communities Inc., a US-based Real Estate Investment Trust and manager of luxury apartments.

In 2016, Sports Authority closed after the chain went out of business and was replaced by Burlington in 2018. A.C. Moore also closed in 2016 and was replaced by Trader Joe's in 2017, with Xfinity joining in 2019.

In November 2019, Kmart was closed by Sears, marking the closure of the last of the marketplace's original anchors after 38 years.

== Marketplace ==
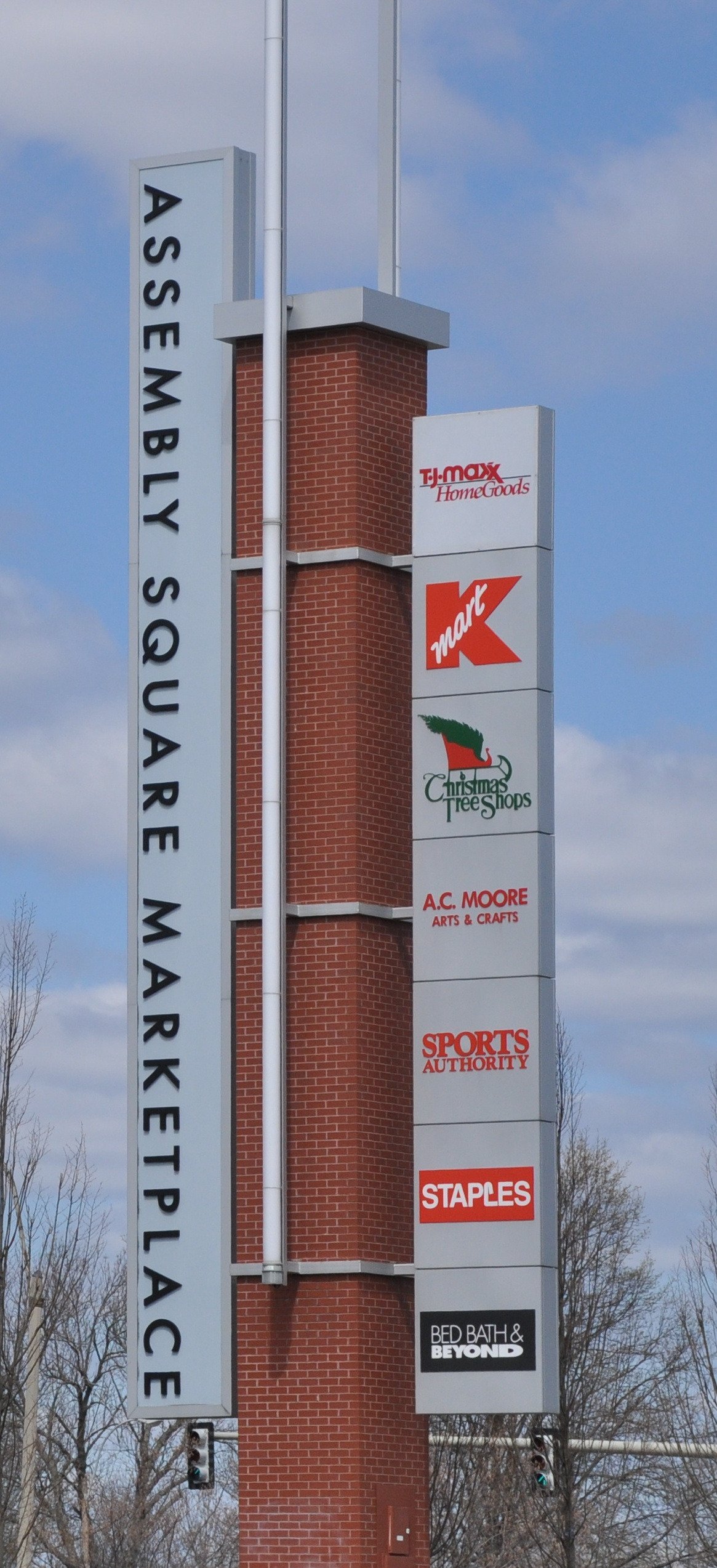
Assembly Square Marketplace sign listing tenants as of 2012. All but TJ Maxx and Staples have since gone out of business, and been replaced.

Assembly Square Marketplace is a retail park and mixed-use development located in Assembly Square. From the 1980s until the mid-2000s, it was an enclosed shopping mall called Assembly Square Mall. Scheduled plans for the facility call for a six phased expansion, thus changing its classification into super regional mall. 66.5 acres (269,000 m^{2}) of office, retail, residential, research and development, hospitality and entertainment space are envisioned by project completion in 2011.

=== Marketplace history ===
Assembly Square Mall opened in 1980. The mall building was previously occupied by Somerville Assembly, a Ford Motor Company factory, and was later used as a supermarket distribution center before its conversion to a mall.

The 322,000-square-foot (29,900 m^{2}) mall was originally anchored by a 79,000 sq ft (7,300 m^{2}) Jordan Marsh and a 95,637 sq ft (8,885.0 m^{2}) Kmart. These anchor stores remained the same until 1996, when Macy's acquired Jordan Marsh. Macy's closed the store in 1997, and by 1999, it was replaced with Building 19.

Shortly after Building 19 opened, the mall was closed off except for Building 19 and Kmart. The vacant mall and Building 19 spaces were gutted and reconfigured in 2005. The Kmart store remained in place.

The new Assembly Square Marketplace was completed in early 2006. The area around the mall will be redeveloped as an "urban village"-style development.

== Ownership and occupants ==
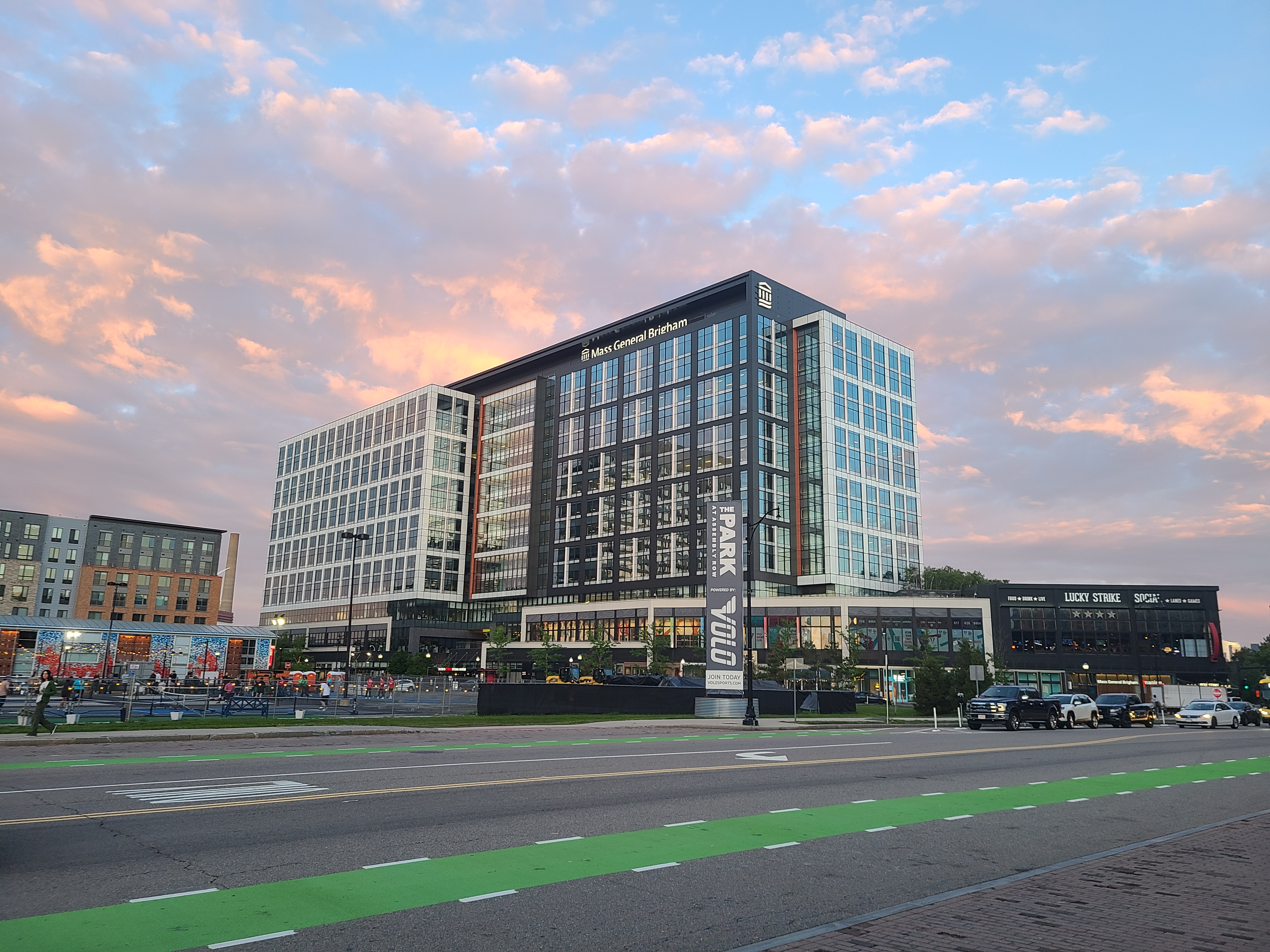
Healthcare system Mass General Brigham occupies a prominent office building on the southern end of Assembly Row

The property owner and lead developer for both Assembly Row and Assembly Square Marketplace is Federal Realty Investment Trust (FRIT), a Maryland-based real estate investment trust.

The first Legoland Discovery Centre in New England and seventh in the United States is located on the property. The indoor family entertainment center based on Lego construction toys is housed in a 44,000 sq ft (4,100 m^{2}) space opened in Spring 2014. Other brands announced to be moving into the neighborhood's retail spaces early on included Nike, Le Creuset, Brooks Brothers, Chico's, J.P. Licks, and AMC Theatres.

In December 2013 the state's largest hospital system, Mass General Brigham, known at the time as Partners HealthCare, announced it would consolidate administrative operations from 14 sites in eastern Massachusetts and move 4,500 non-hospital employees into 700,000 sq ft (65,000 m^{2}) of a new office building. While the company’s executive headquarters would remain in Boston, offices throughout the region, including locations in Charlestown, Wellesley and Needham closed.

Other offices at Assembly Square include SmartBear Software's headquarters as well as the North American headquarters for German athletic brand Puma.

== Parks ==
On the north side of Assembly Square is the Mystic River. From Route 28 to the MBTA Orange Line and Haverhill Line tracks is the waterfront Sylvester Baxter Riverfront Park. This was redeveloped as part of Assembly Square construction, and enlarged with a land swap between FRIT and the Massachusetts Department of Conservation and Recreation (DCR).

DCR also owns the existing Draw 7 Park, which lies on a triangular strip between the Mystic River and railroad tracks for the Orange Line and the Newburyport/Rockport Line Commuter Rail. It is adjacent to the Amelia Earhart Dam and connects to a bike path which is riverward of the MBTA Charlestown maintenance facility. The park has been closed for major renovations since 2024. A pedestrian bridge from Draw 7 Park across the Mystic River to the Northern Strand Community Trail is expected to be constructed from 2026 to 2029, with design funding from the Encore Boston Harbor casino (located at the northern end), $650,00 from the Massachusetts Gaming Commission, and the remainder of an estimated $62 million from MassDOT. (The contract was approved by MassDOT in September 2026.) The MBTA plans to construct an entry to the Assembly Orange Line station on the Draw 7 Park side of the tracks to shorten the otherwise circuitous pedestrian route to the bridge; construction funding of $17.5 million depends on community benefits negotiated by the city of Everett with the Kraft Group to mitigate nearby construction of a new stadium for the New England Revolution soccer team.

FRIT constructed a pedestrian underpass (under Route 28) to connect Baxter Park westward to the Somerville side of the Mystic River Reservation (the next segment being known as the Shore Drive Parklands).
