= Corwin Manufacturing Company =

Defunct American motor vehicle manufacturer

Overview
- Manufacturer: Corwin Manufacturing Company

Body and chassis
- Body style: Side-entrance tourer

Powertrain
- Engine: Four-cylinder
- Transmission: None

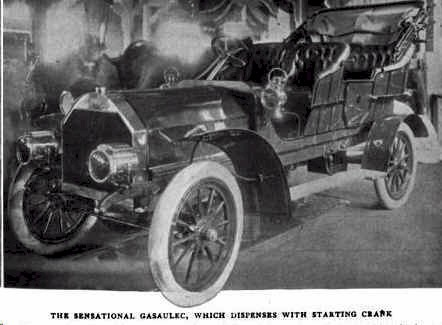
1905 Gas-Au-Lec 40-45 HP touring

Corwin Manufacturing Company (formerly Vaughn Machine Company) was a pioneer brass era American automobile company based in Peabody, Massachusetts.

During 1905 and 1906, Corwin produced the Gas-au-lec, a five-place side-entrance tourer with a copper-jacketed four-cylinder four-cycle gasoline (petrol) engine of 40-45 hp (30-34 kW). The company's ads claimed it lacked starting crank, "change speed gears", clutch, cams, valve gear, tappets, and complications, thanks to electromagnetically operated inlet valves.

== Sources ==
- Clymer, Floyd. Treasury of Early American Automobiles, 1877-1925. New York: Bonanza Books, 1950.
- David Burgess Wise, The New Illustrated Encyclopedia of Automobiles.
