= Norfolk Assembly =

Ford factory near Norfolk, Virginia (1925-2007)

Coordinates: 36°49′59.44″N 76°14′55.94″W

Norfolk Assembly was a Ford manufacturing plant that opened on April 20, 1925 on the Elizabeth River, near downtown Norfolk, Virginia, eventually closing in 2007 as part of Ford's Way Forward restructuring — after manufacturing more than 7.9 million cars and trucks over almost a century of production.

Modeled after the River Rouge Plant, the facility eventually included a power house, water treatment plant, barber shop, safety-shoe store, restaurant, fitness center and TV studio. At the time of its closure, Ford employed more than 2,600 people at the 2,800,000-square-foot (260,000 m^{2}) facility. Ford invested $375 million at the plant in 2002 to upgrade it for production of the redesigned eleventh generation 2004 F-150.

Archival papers of the noted industrial architect Albert Kahn (housed at the Bentley Historical Library, University of Michigan) indicate that in 1934 Kahn's office prepared drawings for architectural work at Norfolk Assembly.

Norfolk Assembly produced models including the Model T, Model A and school bus chassis. The last model manufactured at the plant was the F150.

== Early history ==
As early as 1915, Ford Motor Company began planning a large assembly plant in Norfolk, projecting an initial investment of $300,000 ($7.4M in 2017 dollars), estimating an annual assembly of more than 2,000 cars and identifying several suitable sites.

The Mayor of Norfolk, S. Heth Tyler, drove the first Model T off the Norfolk Assembly line on April 20, 1925. At the time, the plant was the largest non-seafaring-related manufacturing enterprise in Norfolk. During its first year, the plant produced 29,519 automobiles.

The plant closed down Model T production in 1927 to gear up for Model A production. On February 21, 1928, the Norfolk FORD Assembly Plant began its production of the Model A Ford.

In 1942, Ford sold the plant to the federal government for $2 million and it became the Naval Landing Force Equipment Depot. Ford repurchased the plant in 1946 for $400,000 less than the company had sold it for in 1942.

== Closure ==
As of 2004, the plant's productivity ranked 17th-best among 45 truck assembly plants, producing a truck in 22 hours, 54 minutes – 83 minutes faster than the national average, operating at 109 percent capacity compared with 94 percent in 2003. As late as December 2005, it had appeared that Norfolk Assembly would not be closing. The plant was represented by United Auto Workers Local 919.

A drawing was held the last week of June 2007, for the last F150 produced at the plant. The truck, a red 2007 F-150 Lariat, was won by Corey Bauswell of Portsmouth, Virginia. The last F-150 left the assembly line just after 7 AM on Thursday, June 28, 2007.

== Subsequent history ==
In March 2011, the assembly plant was sold to Jacoby Development, Inc. for $14.2 million. The development company renamed the facility the Virginia Renaissance Center and planned to demolish all structures on the site except the 662,000-square-foot main assembly building, making way for a mixed-use industrial project.

In 2011, the main assembly building was purchased by Katoen Natie for $10.5 million to be used as a distribution hub for plastic pellets (nurdles) used in the manufacturing of plastic products.

As of 2014, the final parcels of Norfolk Assembly were sold for $4.1 million to The Schaubach Companies. with Katoen Natie retaining an option on the remaining 25 acres of the property. The Shaubach parcels were in turn sold to Bay Disposal, a trash collection and recycling company.

== See also ==
- List of former automotive manufacturing plants
