= Gas-au-lec =

American car, made 1905–1906

Overview
- Manufacturer: Corwin Manufacturing Company
- Production: 1905–1906
- Assembly: Peabody, Massachusetts

Body and chassis
- Class: Touring car
- Body style: Side entrance

Powertrain
- Engine: Four-cylinder, four-stroke, 40-45 hp

The Gas-au-lec was an American automobile manufactured by Corwin Manufacturing Company of Peabody, Massachusetts.

During 1905 and 1906, Corwin produced this five-seat side-entrance tourer with a copper-jacketed four-cylinder four-cycle gasoline engine of 40-45 hp (30-34 kW). The company's ads claimed it lacked a starting crank, "change speed gears", clutch, cams, valve gear, tappets, and complications, thanks to electromagnetically operated inlet valves. Only about four were made.

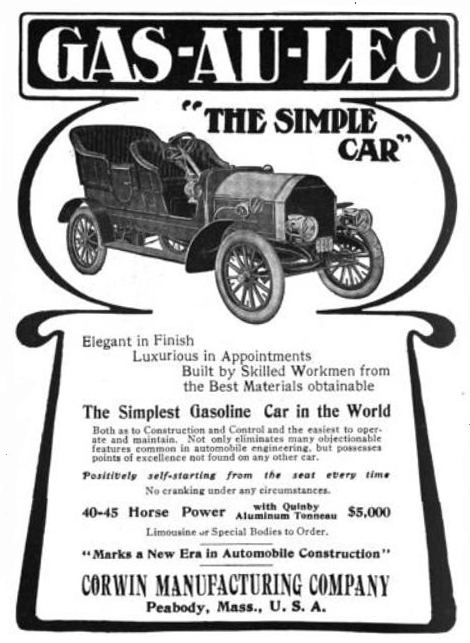
1906 Gas-au-lec advertisement
