= Nissan Heritage Collection =

Car gallery in Zama, Kanagawa, Japan

Coordinates: 35.494179°N 139.425034°E

- Industry: Automobile
- Headquarters: Zama, Japan
- Services: Public exhibition
- Parent: Nissan

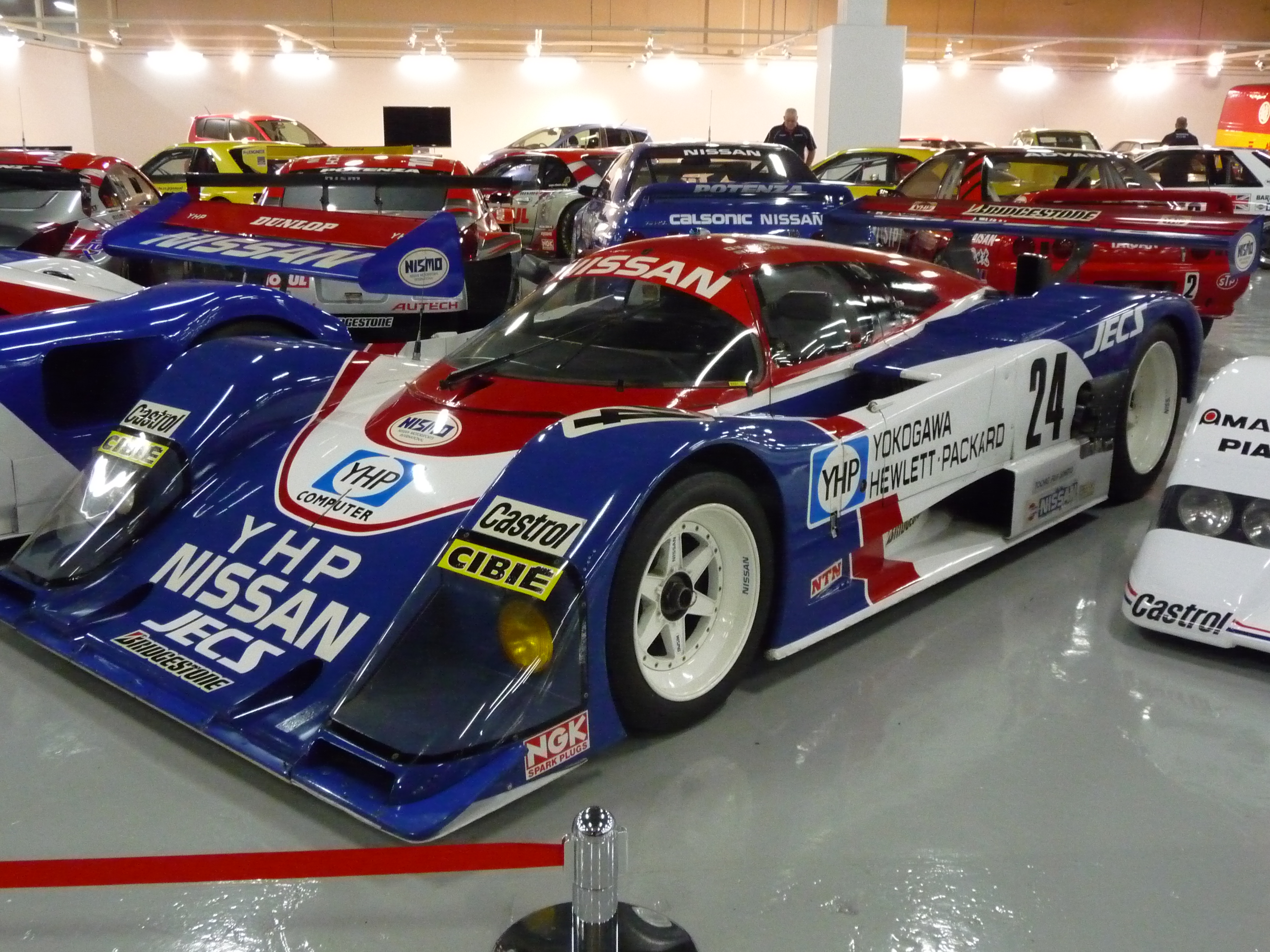
Nissan R88C.

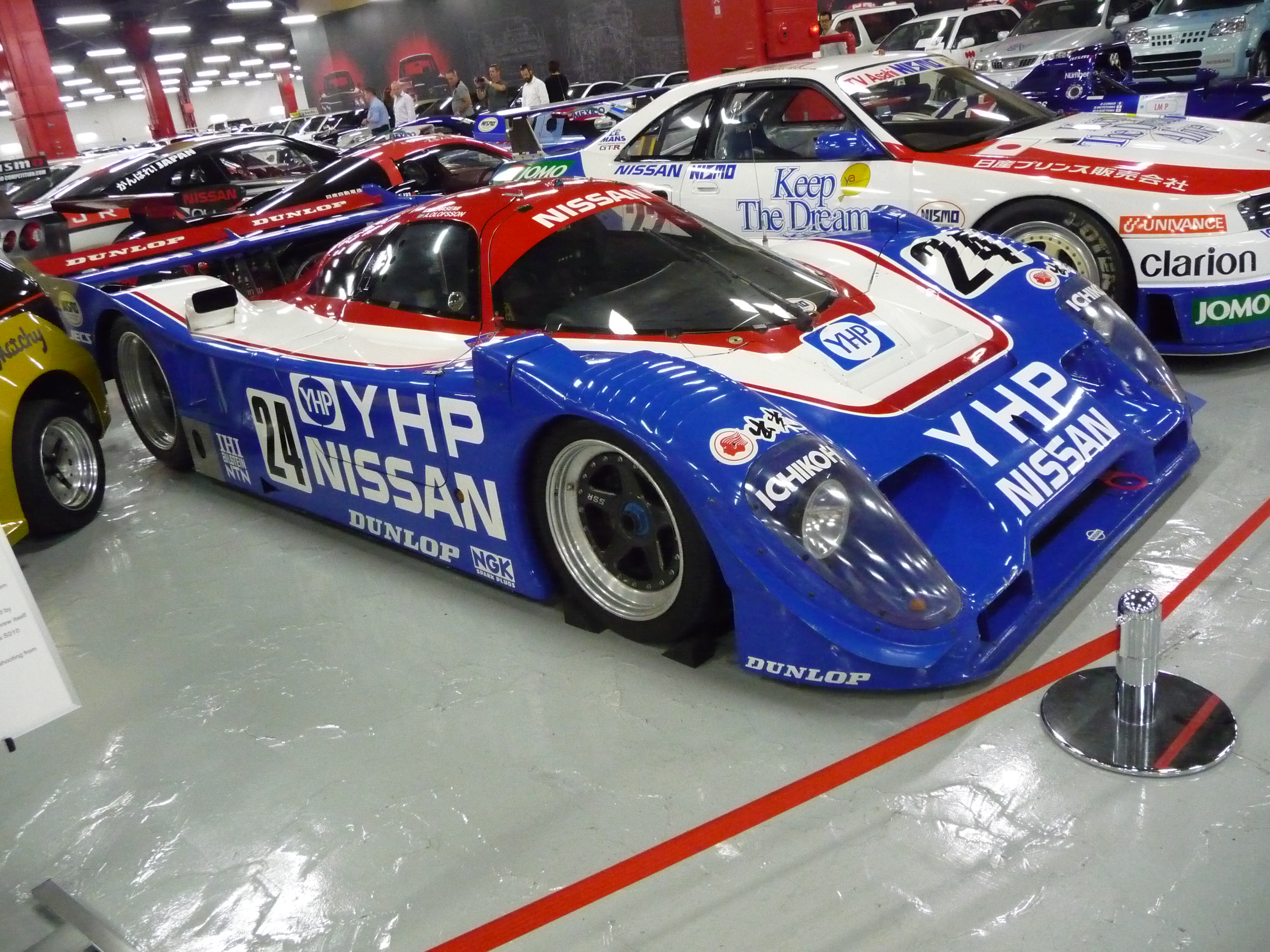
Nissan R90CP.

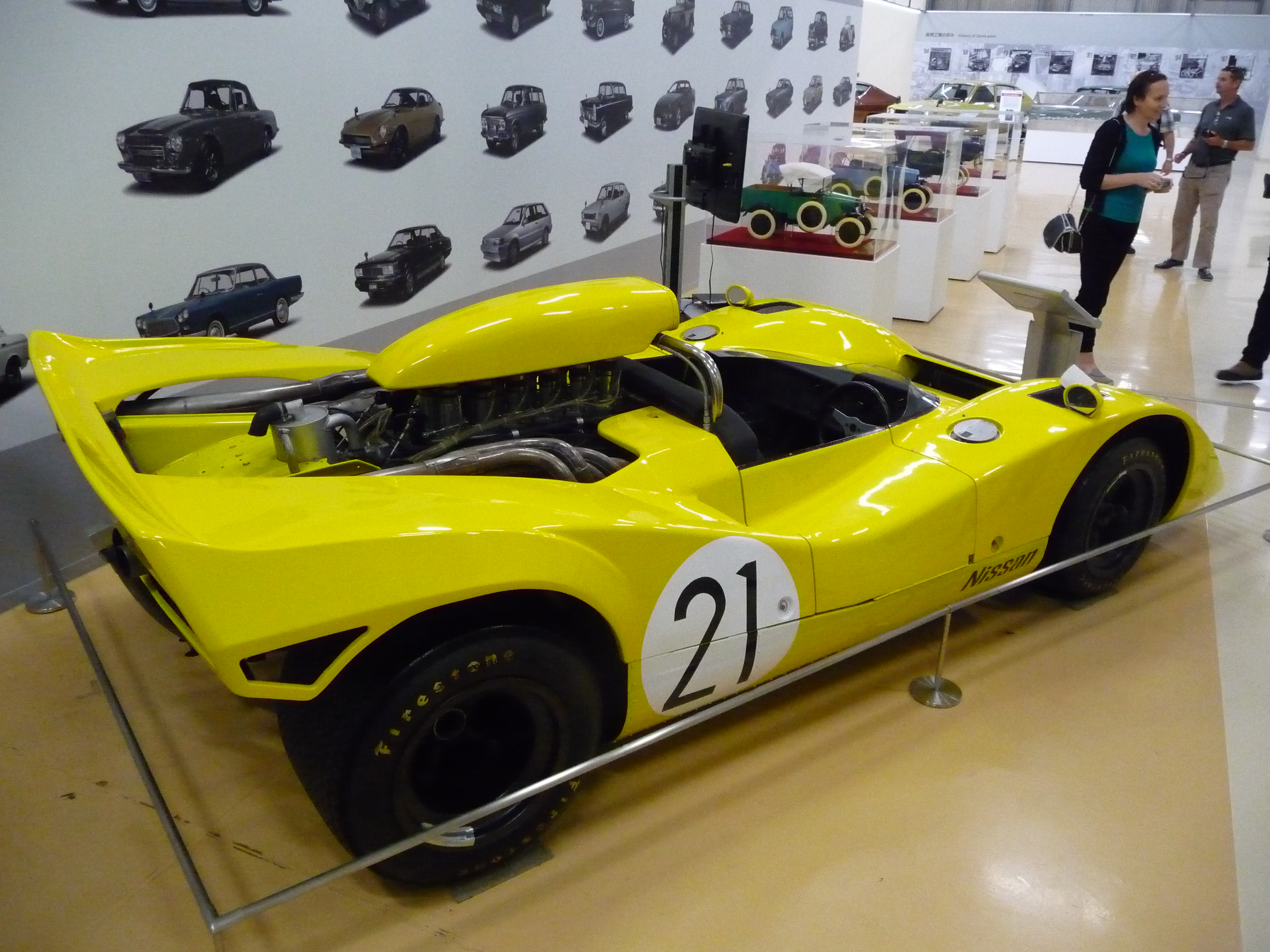
Nissan R382 V12.

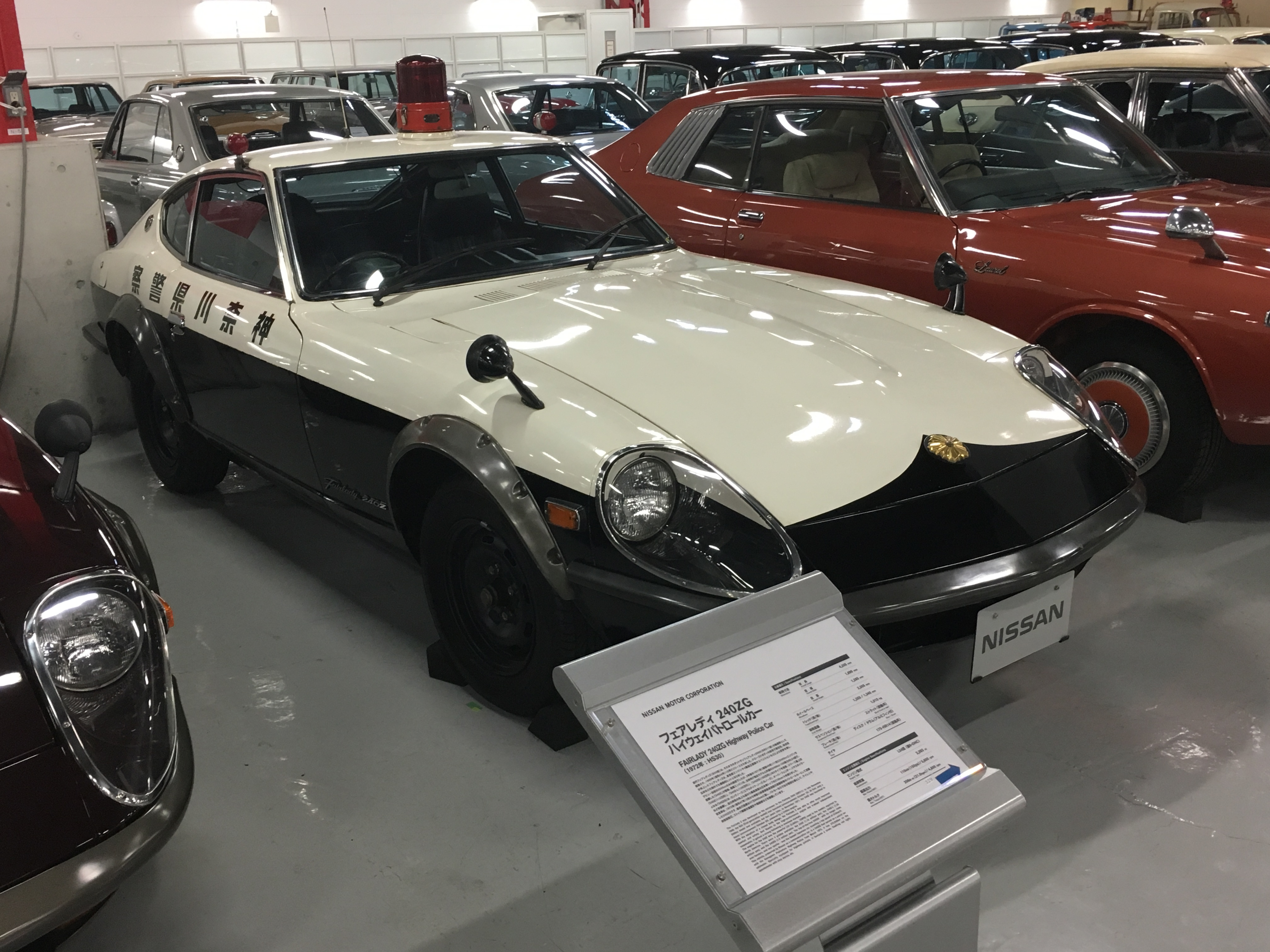
Fairlady Z Highway Patrol Car.

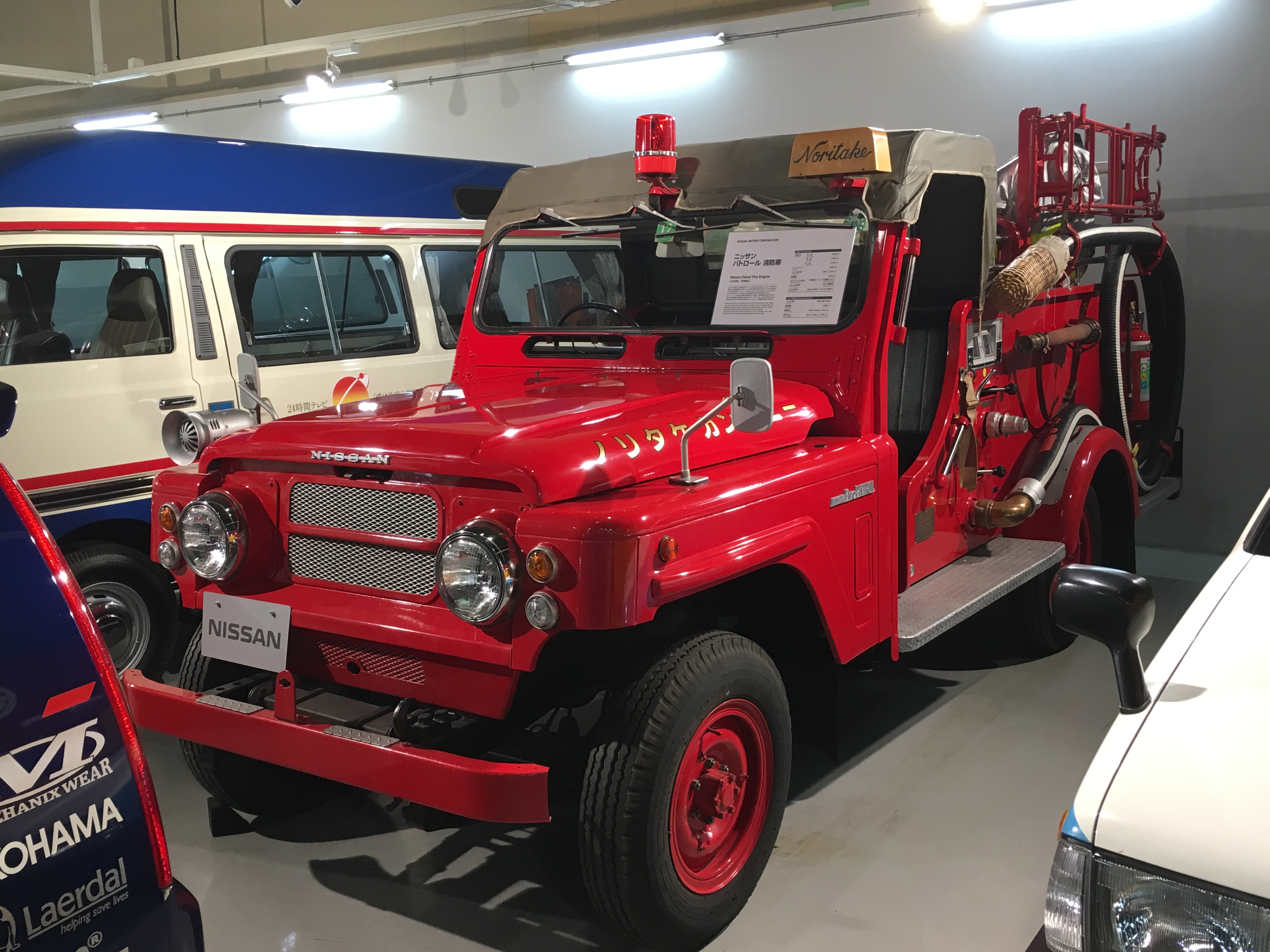
Nissan Patrol fire truck.

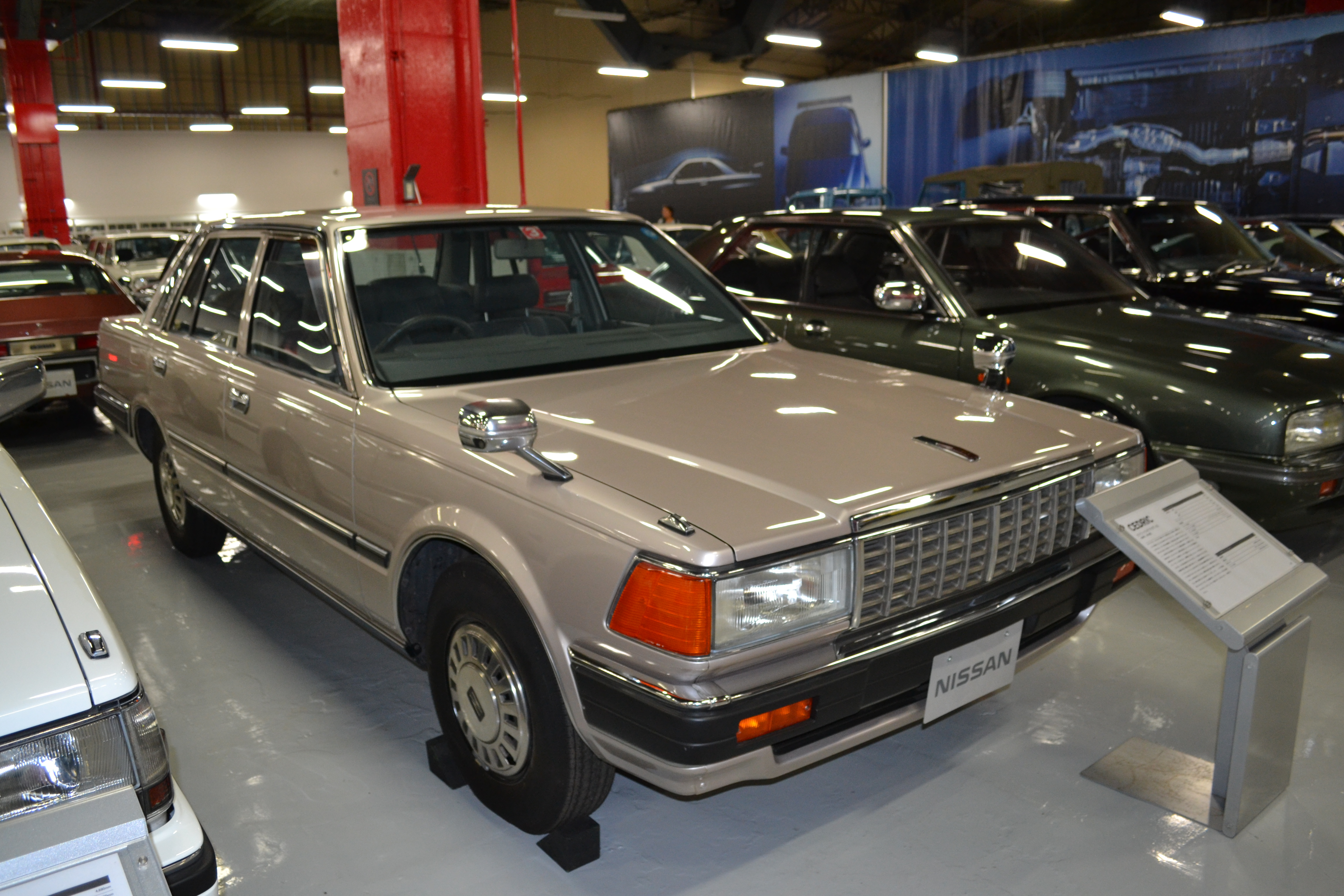
Nissan Cedric Sedan (Y30).

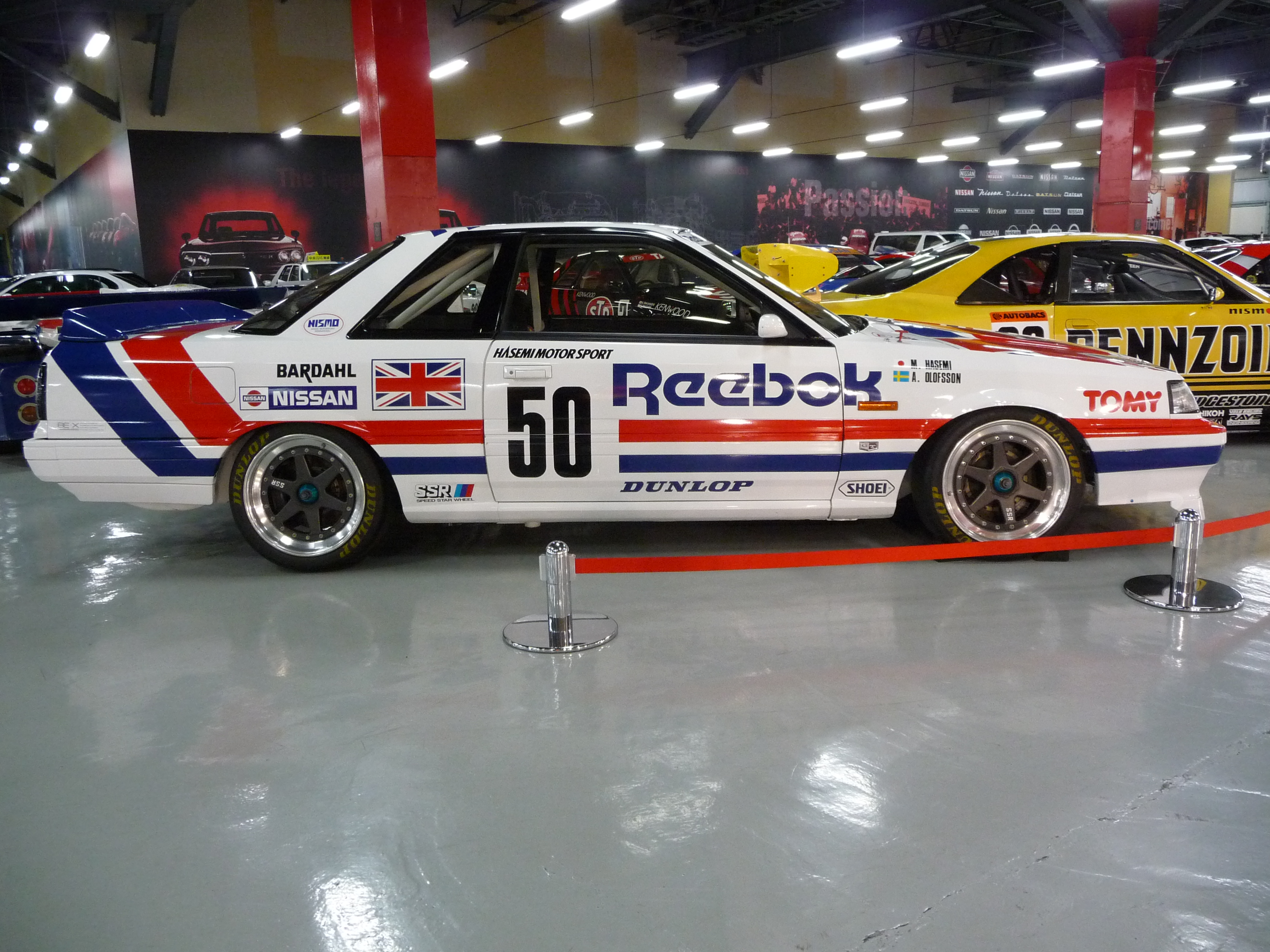
HR31 Skyline Group A.

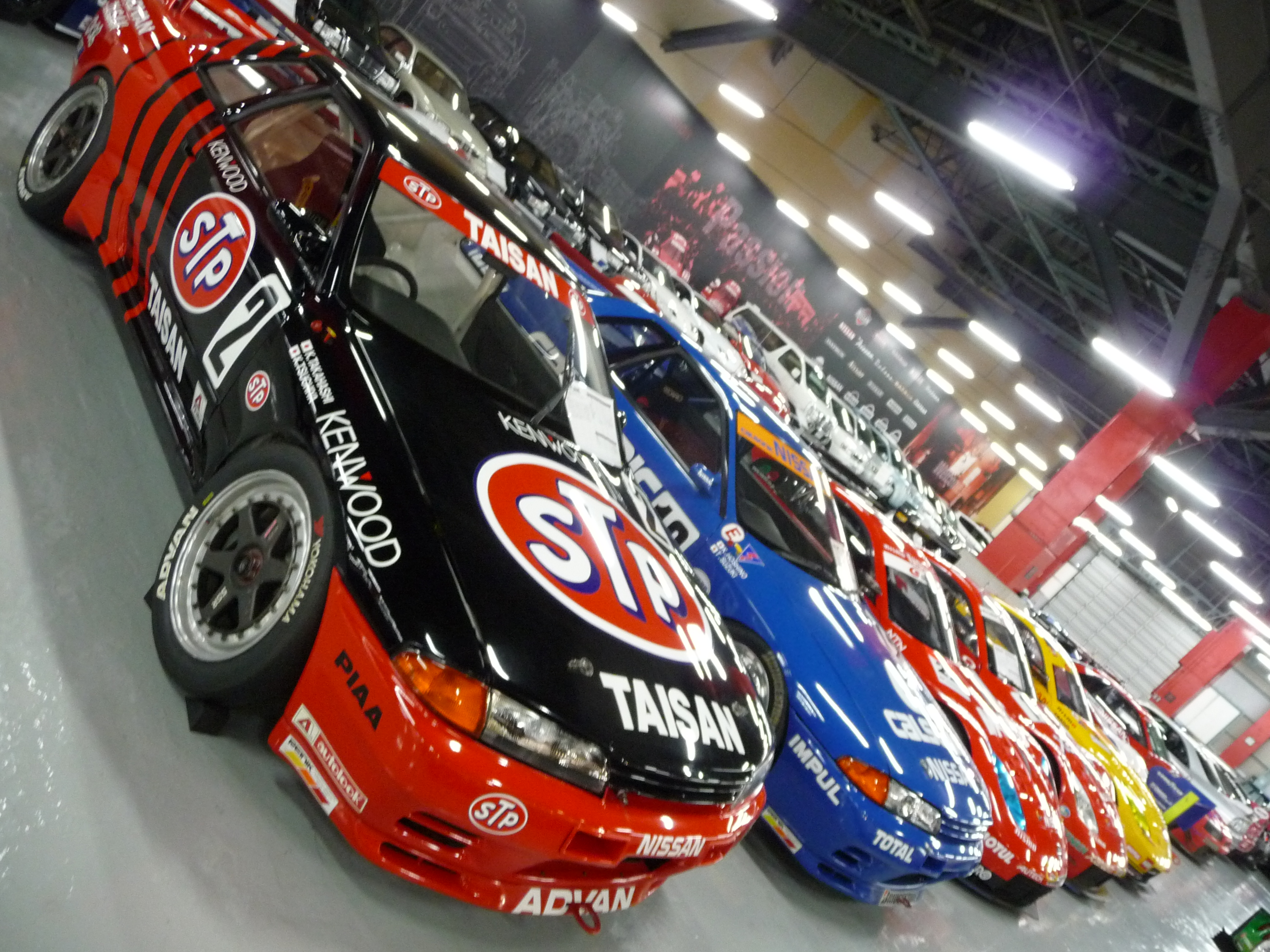
Nissan Skyline GT-R Group A.

The Nissan Heritage Collection is a private car gallery located in the Nissan engine manufacturing plant in Zama, Kanagawa, Japan.

== History ==
The Zama facility, where the collection is housed, used to be Nissan's most advanced assembly facility when it opened in the 1960s. It was previously housed in Nissan's Oppama and was also known as the Nissan DNA Museum.

Up until 2013–2014, the collection was entirely private, with no public access whatsoever. By 2018, it had welcomed a total of 15.000 visitors.

== Description ==
The museum focuses on restoration and safekeeping of Datsun, Prince and Nissan cars, and is curated by former Nissan career employees. The facility houses more than 450 cars dating as far back as the 1930s. 70% of the cars in the collection are in drivable condition. 300 cars are on permanent display. The exhibition is curated by David Bishop, senior manager at Nissan.

Visits to the facility are limited. Visitors must register for a visit online and wait for an approval. Visits last about 80 minutes. On weekdays, the engines of some cars are turned on for visitors.

This facility works closely with the Nissan Headquarters Gallery, located in Minato Mirai 21 district, Yokohama, and some cars from the collection are displayed in the gallery on periodical rotation.

There is also a Nissan Heritage Collection in the basement of the Lane Motor Museum in Nashville, Tennessee. The Nissan Engine Museum is located in Yokohama.

== Models exhibited ==
- Datsun 12 Phaeton 1936
- Datsun Type 15 1936
- Tama Electric Car 1947
- Prince Skyline Deluxe 1957
- Prince Skyline Sport 1962
- Prince R380-I (n°11) - Prince R380-II
- Skyline GT-R 1969
- Silvia 1965
- S30 Fairlady Z 1969
- Sunny B110 1970
- R390 Le Mans
- R390 GT1
