= Somerville Assembly =

Former Ford Motor Company Factory

Coordinates: 42°23′34.64″N 71°4′49.60″W

The Somerville Assembly was a Ford Motor Company factory in Somerville, Massachusetts which opened in 1926 as a replacement to the Cambridge Assembly. Following the failure of the Edsel, the plant, which had been one of the region's largest employers, closed its doors in 1958. At that time it was the Edsel division's only Edsel-only assembly line as all other Edsel plants were shared with Mercury or Ford. Somerville built only the larger Corsair and Citation big series Edsels which shared chassis with Mercury. The closure created severe consequences for the local economy, as it paid the city over $1 million in annual taxes.

For many years after it closed it served as the grocery distribution center for First National Stores (FINAST).

It was redeveloped into the Assembly Square Marketplace, as well as Assembly Square.
