= Cambridge Assembly =

Coordinates: 42°21′15.29″N 71°6′35.14″W

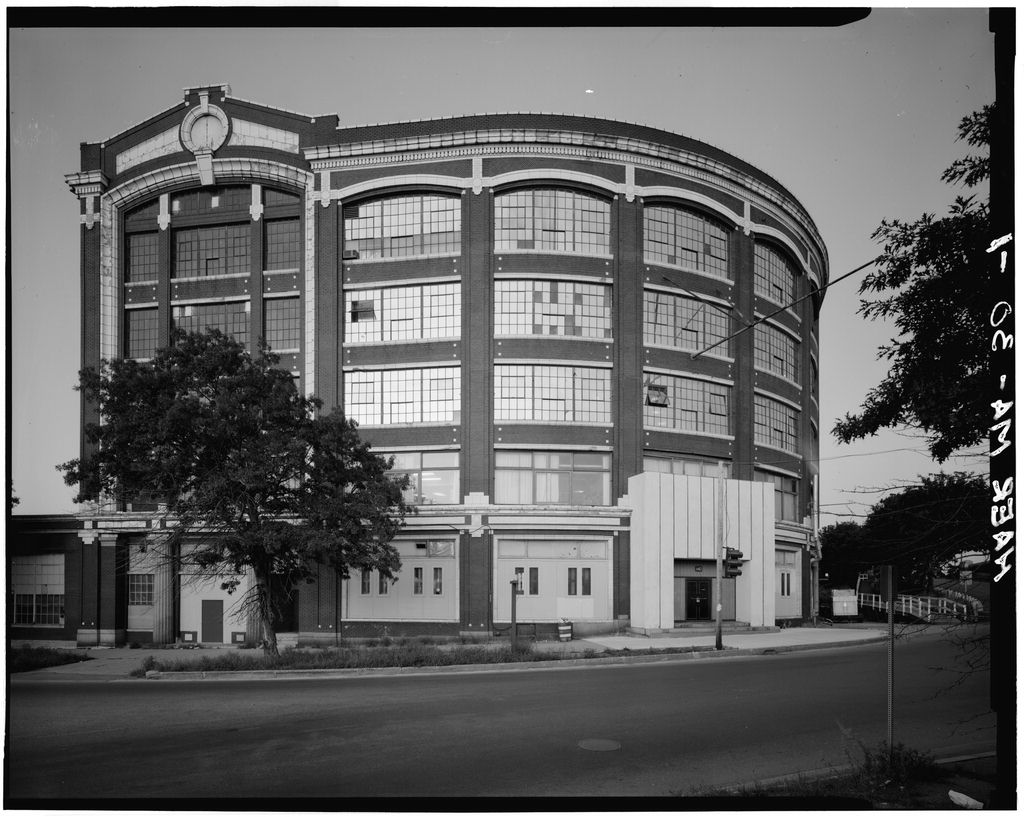
Cambridge Assembly building, 1982

Cambridge Assembly was a Ford Motor Company factory in Cambridge, Massachusetts which opened in 1913. The factory had the first vertically integrated assembly line in the world. It was replaced in 1926 by the Somerville Assembly. The plant was later reused by Polaroid Corporation, and is now owned by the Massachusetts Institute of Technology.
