= Cold Water Cowboys =

Canadian documentary/reality TV series

- Cold Water Cowboys season 2 poster
- Genre: reality show, documentary series
- Created by: Tyson Hepburn, John Driftmier
- Developed by: Tyson Hepburn
- Directed by: Tyson Hepburn; M.T.Morrow; Matthew Shewchuk; Victor Kushmaniuk; Stephan Peterson; Peter Gombos; Daniel Sekulich; Michael Sheehan; Samara Truster; Donny Rose
- Starring: Paul Tiller; Adam Dodd; Richard Gillett; Conway Caines; Morris Anstey; Rick Crane; Justin Bridger; Calvin Kerrivan; Donald Spence; Kurtis Kerrivan; Lee Pond; Rick Caines
- Country of origin: Canada
- Original language: English
- No. of seasons: 4
- No. of episodes: 34

Production
- Executive producers: Audrey Mehler; David Paperny; Cal Shumiatcher; Trevor Hodgson; Aynsley Vogel; Beth Wichterich
- Production location: Newfoundland
- Running time: 46 minutes
- Production companies: Paperny Entertainment; Entertainment One

Original release
- Network: Discovery (Canada)
- Release: February 25, 2014 – June 7, 2017

Cold Water Cowboys is a Canadian documentary/reality series developed by Tyson Hepburn and John Driftmier. It aired on Discovery Channel Canada for 34 episodes and 4 seasons from 2014 to 2017. The show was filmed in Newfoundland and tells the story of six local captains and their crews.

Outside Canada the show is known as Cold Water Gold (National Geographic UK and international) and Cold Water Captains (The Weather Channel). It is available globally on Netflix under its original title.

== Synopsis ==
Set in several locations of Newfoundland and Labrador, Cold Water Cowboys shows the life of fishermen after the Collapse of the Atlantic northwest cod fishery in 1992. Those who remained in business had to switch to crab, shrimp, turbot, herring, mackerel and other species. The show has a local flavour and some episodes have subtitles to explain Newfoundland English. Richard Gillett, one of the show's captains, said the show is not only about fishing but also about "the communities and the families and the relationships between the fishermen and the communities."

== History ==
Filming Cold Water Cowboys (season 2)

The Cold Water Cowboys concept was developed by a Canadian producer Tyson Hepburn and director John Driftmier who were friends since film school. In fall 2012, the two went to Twillingate to film a demo reel and discovered fifth-generation fisherman Richard Gillett. For 10 days when Driftmier worked at St. John's, Hepburn filmed Gillett's team and their work.

Hepburn and Driftmier produced a demo reel in late 2012 and presented it to David Paperny who agreed to produce the show with Cal Shumachter, Audrey Mehler and Trevor Hodgson at Paperny Entertainment. The concept received support from Discovery's vice president Ken MacDonald and director of commissioning, Edwina Follows. A month before the shooting, Driftmier died in a plane crash in Kenya filming Dangerous Flights, so Hepburn and the team continued without him.

The first season was shot in Newfoundland between April and September 2013 with the filming crew spending up to 3 week aboard. Cold Water Cowboys premiered at midnight February 25, 2014, gathering one of the highest first-week ratings in Discovery Canada's history.

Season 2 premiered on March 10, 2015, adding newcomers Andre and Michelle Jesso, and Morris Anstey. For the launch Discovery developed an HTML5 fishing simulator video game Atlantic Empire with characters from the show.

Season 3 premiered on March 8, 2016 with a new captain Rick Crane joining the show. Returning captains were Andre and Michelle Jesso, Conway Caines, Paul Tiller, Richard Gillett and Morris Antsey.

Season 4 premiered on April 18, 2017 and featured Paul Tiller, Morris Anstey and Rick Crane. New captains on the show were father-son team of Calvin Kerrivan and Kurtis and Lee Pond.

== Controversies ==
Midnight Shadow Captain Richard Gillet was arrested in October 2015 and convicted in September 2016 for the assault of a dock worker while filming season 2 of the show. He received a conditional discharge and a year of probation in court.

Gillet received national attention in April 2017 when he staged a hunger strike in front of the federal Department of Fisheries and Oceans building in St. John's to protest against the actions of the DFO in its governance of fisheries. As the vice-president of the Federation of Independent Sea Harvesters of Newfoundland and Labrador, he demanded a meeting with the fisheries minister over quota cuts to shrimp and crab. The hunger strike lasted 11 days and ended with Gillet being taken to the hospital. In September 2017, Gillett was fined $14,000 for the 3 violations of the Fisheries Act in 2016.

Another star of the show, Nicole Daniel's captain Toby Young faced charges in August 2015 for failing to comply with the condition of a fishing license. In August 2016 Sebastian Sails' captain Morris Anstey faced charges for an assault committed the same month. In February 2017, he was convicted and sentenced to 12-months probation period.

== Awards and nominations ==
In 2015 the show was nominated for the 3rd Canadian Screen Awards at "Best Factual Program or Series" category but lost to the Ice Pilots show.

== Cast ==
Person	Role	Location	Ship	Seasons	Notes
Morris Anstey	Captain	Summerford	Sebastian Sails	2-4	Morris fishes with his father and his son.
Rick Crane	Captain	Cox's Cove	Crane's Legacy	2-4	Crane first appeared in season 2 as a skiffman to Andre and Michelle Jesso. He joined season 3 as the captain of his own ship having his best friend and first mate Steven «Rope» Park and rookie Jacob Payne in his crew.
Calvin Kerrivan	Captain	Placentia	Crewshell Chill	4	Calvin works with his son and First Mate Kurtis. They became famous for the unusual set of fisheries from whelk to sea cucumber.
Kurtis Kerrivan	First Mate	Placentia	Crewshell Chill	4	
Paul Tiller	Captain	Valleyfield, Bonavista Bay	Atlantic Bandit	1 – 4	
Adam Dodd	Narrator			1	Adam Dodd was a show narrator for the first season. He was also an assistant editor of 12 episodes.
Richard Gillett	Captain	Twillingate	Midnight Shadow	1-3	Gillet is the most controversial member of the crew.
Conway Caines	Captain	Port Saunders	SeaDoo	1	Sea Doo boat featured in the show belongs to Conway's father Rick Caines.
Justin Bridger	Captain	Carmanville	MJ Nadine	1	
Donald Spence	Captain	Port au Choix	K & N Enterprise	1	
Lee Pond	Captain	Valleyfield	Jacob Louisa	4	Lee Pond is one of the youngest captains in the show. He also has the biggest and most expensive boat in Valleyfield and has to pay a big boat debt.
Rick Caines		Port Saunders	SeaDoo	1	Rick is the father of Conway Caines. He appeared only in 1 episode of the show at first season.
Andre Jesso	Captain	Piccadilly	Wave on Wave	2-3	
Michelle Jesso	First Mate	Piccadilly	Wave on Wave	2-3	Michelle is the only woman in the show. Outside of fishing she is an Avon sales representative and a charity fundraiser.
Todd Young	Captain	Woody Point	Nicole Daniel	1	In 2015 Todd Young has been charged with several counts of failing to comply with conditions of fishing licence in 2010. All charges made against Todd have been dropped in 2021.

== Episodes ==
Season	Episodes	Season premiere	Season finale
1	10	February 25, 2014	April 23, 2014
2	8	March 10, 2015	April 29, 2015
3	8	March 8, 2016	April 27, 2016
4	7	April 18, 2017	June 7, 2017
