= Tyson Hepburn =

Vancouver-based television creator, director, and producer

- Occupations: Television creator, director, producer
- Known for: Mayhem Entertainment, Tyson Media Productions
- Notable work: Rust Valley Restorers, Pyros, Jacked! and Cold Water Cowboys
- Website: tysonmedia.ca

Tyson Hepburn is a Vancouver-based Television creator, director and producer. He is also an Executive Producer at Mayhem Entertainment.

== Career ==
Hepburn's career has mainly focused on documentaries and reality television productions in which he has contributed as creator, director, and producer. Pyros, Jacked!, and Cold Water Cowboys are some of the TV series created by Hepburn. Cold Water Cowboys, a series about Newfoundland fishermen, received the highest ratings ever as a Discovery Channel premiere. The series was distributed by Netflix internationally. Pyros was aired in more than 120 countries.

Hepburn worked John Driftmier to develop the series Dangerous Flights and Cold Water Cowboys. Driftmier lost his life in a plane crash during production for Dangerous Flights. Hepburn then formed Mayhem Entertainment with Matt Shewchuck, with Rust Valley Restorers as their first production in 2017. The series has gone on to become a global hit on History Channel Canada and Netflix International. In early 2020, the series garnered a nomination for the Canadian Screen Awards.

== Television series ==
- Rust Valley Restorers
- Pets & Pickers
- The Dog Dudes
- Cold Water Cowboys
- Keeping Canada Safe
- Selling Big
- Jacked!
- Dangerous Flights
- Cold Diggers
- Bomb Hunters
- License to Drill
- Cash Atom
- Intervention
- Pyros
