= Pyros (TV series) =

- Genre: Docuseries
- Created by: John Driftmier; Tyson Hepburn
- Directed by: Neil Thomas; Brad Quenville
- Narrated by: Kavan Smith
- Country of origin: Canada
- Original language: English
- No. of seasons: 2
- No. of episodes: 16

Production
- Executive producers: Michael Chechik; Gabriela Schonbach; David Gullason
- Production company: Omnifilm Entertainment

Original release
- Network: Discovery Channel
- Release: April 24, 2012 – 2013

Pyros is a reality television series that follows Montreal based pyrotechnic company, Groupe Fiatlux-Ampleman (GFA), as they travel to Canada (for Canada Day), Mexico, the United Kingdom, Congo, France, Germany, and the United States (for July 4) locations and attempt to execute large fireworks displays. Pyros premiered on the Discovery Channel (Canada) on April 24, 2012. It was renewed for a second season which aired May 26, 2013. The show has aired in over 120 countries worldwide including The Weather Channel in the United States and on Discovery Channel in the United Kingdom, Europe, the Middle East and Africa.

== Cast ==
- Eric Cardinal – Head Designer and Co-owner, GFA
- Maude Furtado – General Manager, GFA
- Phillipe Girard – Head Pyrotech, GFA
- Sebastien Roy – Technical Director and Co-owner, GFA
- Benoit Berthelet – Designer, GFA
- Hugues Lalonde – Project Manager, GFA
- Mathieu Girard – Pyrotechnician, GFA
- Sebastien Bourget – Pyrotechnician, GFA

== Episodes ==
=== Season 1 ===
- Episode 101 – "Fire and Ice": GFA pyros have first to battle technical glitches in snowy Quebec, only to feel the heat later in Spain.
- Episode 102 – "For Auld Lang Syne": Two simultaneous New Year’s Eve celebrations push GFA to the limit, and Sebastien finds himself in a highly dangerous situation.
- Episode 103 – "Breaking Point": Human error costs GFA public humiliation on both sides of the country.
- Episode 104 – "It Was a Dark and Stormy Night": The GFA pyros will have to battle bureaucracy and intense weather conditions…if they want to win the prize, while in France, the team finds that they are the underdog in an intense competition.
- Episode 105 – "Make No Mistake": Maude and her pyros struggle against mistakes, technical glitches and dangerous layouts that overshadow three of GFA’s most important shows.
- Episode 106 – "Then We Take Berlin": GFA saves the day when they assist another team with an overly ambitious show, only to push themselves to the max right after that at the “World Cup” of fireworks in Berlin.
- Episode 107 – "The Falls": The pyros fight their own battle of Britain overseas, then return home only to face an even greater test at the foot of a towering waterfall.
- Episode 108 – "Blow the Roof Off": In Campeche, Mexico, Sebastien and Philippe learn how to do pyro “Mexican Style”, while their other GFA teammates help stage the biggest show they’ve seen for over a million spectators.

=== Season 2 ===
- Episode 201 – "The Big Show": The GFA pyros are tested at the Canada Day show in Ottawa and then get in the middle of a pyro feud between rival pyro families in Italy.
- Episode 202 – "Congo": Philippe Girard and his brother Mathieu take on a dangerous job in the Congo where they try to fire a big Independence Day show.
- Episode 203 – "Mexican Fire": The pyros set up a tricky rooftop show in the centre of Atlixco, Mexico. Later, an unseen force jeopardizes a massive setup at a competition in Germany.
- Episode 204 – "Rookie on a Roof": GFA pyros Philippe and Eric find themselves outgunned at a high-profile event in the UK. Seb risks giving a rookie the chance of a lifetime in old Quebec City.
- Episode 205 – "Barcelona Nights": Philippe risks his life when things go off the rails at a show in Barcelona. The team scrambles to launch 18 shows in two days for St. Jean Baptiste Day in Quebec.
- Episode 206 – "Istanbul": Philippe and Eric struggle to prove themselves to a brash, young Aussie crew as they stage a huge show on the water in Istanbul. And the pyros try to launch an Independence Day show from multiple sites in Guanajuato, Mexico.
- Episode 207 – "It Ain't Cricket": Staging fireworks at an international cricket tournament in South Africa pushes both Seb and Philippe to the edge. GFA has to dig out from a record snowfall in Montreal the day before one of its biggest outdoor shows of the year.
- Episode 208 – "New Year's Eve" The pyros battle fatigue, sickness, and a shortage of crew as they travel the globe staging New Year’s Eve shows.

== Awards ==
In 2013, Pyros was nominated for two Canadian Screen Awards for “Best Documentary Program or Series” and “Best Sound in an Information/Documentary Program or Series” for the “Blame it on Rio” episode.
