= The Dam Busters =

The Dam Busters may refer to:

== Military ==
- Dambusters Raid or Operation Chastise, an attack by the RAF on German dams in World War II
  - No. 617 Squadron RAF, the Royal Air Force squadron who carried out Operation Chastise
- VFA-195, a United States Navy fighter squadron

== Media and entertainment ==
- The Dam Busters (book), a 1951 book by Paul Brickhill about Operation Chastise
  - The Dam Busters (film), a 1955 film based on the book
    - The Dam Busters March, the theme to the film by British composer Eric Coates
- The Dam Busters (video game), a 1984 video game loosely based on Operation Chastise
- "Dambusters", a 2011 episode of Ice Pilots NWT Season 3 about recreating Operation Chastise
- Dambuster Studios, a game development company

== See also ==
- Dam removal, the process of demolishing a dam
