= Dangerous Flights =

- Theme music composer: Paul-Étienne Côté
- Original language: English
- No. of seasons: 2
- No. of episodes: 18

Production
- Producer: PixCom Productions
- Running time: Approx. 45 minutes

Original release
- Network: Discovery Channel
- Release: May 8, 2012 – March 15, 2014

Dangerous Flights is a documentary-style reality television show that airs on the Discovery Channel. The show follows the pilots of C.B. Aviation as they ferry light aircraft to their new owners across distances the aircraft weren't designed to fly and often over routes that are generally considered to be dangerous by the aviation community.

== Cast ==
- Cory Bengtzen (season one-)
- Marcio Lucchese (season one-)
- Brad White (season one-)
- Pete Zaccagnino (season one-)
- Randy McGehee (season one-)
- Dave "Super Dave" Mathieson (season one-)
- Kerry McCauley (season one-)
- Stu Sprung (season one- )
- Yasmina Platt (season one-)
- Bob Raskey (season one- )
- Alex Pichler (season two)
- Claire McCauley (season two)

== Episodes ==
=== Season 1 (2012) ===
No. overall	No. in season	Title	Original release date
1	1	"Turn and Burn"	May 8, 2012
Cory Bengtzen walked away from a lucrative car dealership to embark on a risky new career path: a used airplane delivery business. So far, it's beginning to look like a crash and burn endeavor. On the company's inaugural missions, two trans-global "ferry flights" over unforgiving waters, he and his team of daring cowboy pilots encounter wild weather, dangerous airstrips, and a series of mechanical failures. Enter the cockpit and see if this new business will finally take off, or if Cory's on a disaster collision course.
2	2	"Flight from Hell"	May 15, 2012
Cory Bengtzen feels the stress of running a new aircraft delivery company when two of his pilots walk out on a job, With his company's reputation on the line, he has no choice but to deliver the plane himself. Join him and Randy McGehee as they play a deadly game of country hopscotch. Then climb into the cockpit with new pilots Kerry McCauley and Stu Sprung as they race against a tight deadline with a hurricane on their heels. For Cory and his team, these jobs feel more like kamikaze missions.
3	3	"Fuel Critical"	May 22, 2012
Dense jungles, steep learning curves, and big personalities cause turbulence and tension during two pressure-filled aircraft deliveries. Jump into the cockpit with owner Cory Bengtzen and co-pilot Kerry McCauley as they try to find their feet as a team while flying over the Amazon rainforest. Then follow pilot Randy McGehee on a U.N. relief mission to war-ravaged South Sudan, aboard a 1998 Dornier. It's a plane Randy's never flown, and he has just 48 hours to master it before embarking on the 6,000-mile journey.
4	4	"Fear Factor"	May 29, 2012
The business of selling and delivering small, secondhand planes is rife with risk. Usually, it's the aircraft causing the peril, but on occasion it's the pilots. Can professional air racer Pete Zaccagnino shake off the recent death of a friend at the Reno Air Races and deliver a plane from England to the U.S.? Meanwhile, pilot Randy McGehee, fresh off a mission to South Sudan, is immediately called upon to fly to Brazil. He accepts the job, but a lack of sleep and the constant jumping of time zones are beginning to take a toll.
5	5	"Dark Skies"	June 5, 2012
Cory's business is taking off. The demand for small plane deliveries is mounting, and so is the pressure for his team of cowboy pilots. Take an 11,000-mile island-hopping journey from Australia to the U.S. aboard the Phenom 100, a high-tech executive jet. It's the first time Kerry has flown one, and he needs to learn quickly. This mission will take him to the edge of North Korean airspace and into a blinding storm in Russia. Meanwhile in Grenada, Cory and Randy have visibility issues of their own, battling through black skies to find a safe place to land.
6	6	"Prop Jockeys"	June 12, 2012
"Flights from hell" are part of the job, but this time, the nightmares are happening on the ground. Ferry pilots Kerry McCauley and Stu Sprung are called upon to fly a '78 Piper Navajo Chieftain to Argentina. Unfortunately, they lack the proper paperwork, an offense that could lead to major fines and a possible prison sentence. Meanwhile, in Florida, Pete Zaccagnino and Brad White face another kind of confinement, courtesy of an uncooperative 32-year-old Piper Cheyenne. If they had their way, this "hangar queen" would be on a one-way trip to the scrap heap.
7	7	"No End in Site"	June 19, 2012
Pete and Brad just cannot catch a break. The old Cheyenne is one major headache after another and now they are running out of patience and time. Halfway around the world, Kerry and Stu battle storms, engine problems and a nasty stomach bug to ferry a single-engine Cirrus 19,000 kilometres from Singapore to the U.S.
8	8	"Cockpit Crisis"	June 26, 2012
When pilots walk, the boss gets his hands dirty. Cory and Randy are forced to take on the old run-down Cheyenne. More than 6,000 kilometres of rocky air lay ahead – from Russia to the Philippines. While high above a burning desert, pilots Stu and Kerry run into mechanical problems... in a single-engine plane...

=== Season 2 (2014) ===
No. overall	No. in season	Title	Original release date
9	1	"Wheels Down"	January 11, 2014
The pilots converge in a hangar to hash out last season's most dramatic stories and a hint at what's ahead for Season 2; 18-year-old rookie pilot Claire, Kerry's daughter, is introduced.
10	2	"Ice Breaker"	January 18, 2014
Cory and Pete team up to deliver a Caravan to Kenya. But even before clearing the American border, a monster blizzard and some serious icing threaten to drop them out of the sky. Over in Europe, Marcio and Kerry reunite in the cockpit. But this time the roles are reversed. Kerry is in his element, flying a single engine Cirrus, while jet-loving Marcio runs into trouble with the oxygen system at high altitude.
11	3	"Cold Comfort"	January 25, 2014
After battling a temperamental engine over wide-open ocean, Marcio and Kerry decide it’s time to get some open water survival training. They brave the cold Icelandic water and get a reality check in surviving a ditch. Pete and Cory get their own reality check when they arrive in the Arctic sporting dress shoes and light jackets. The town’s very own super-hero, Polarman, is there to set them straight.
12	4	"Flight US Interruptus"	February 1, 2014
With almost 8,000 kilometers behind them, Pete and Cory face intense headwinds and a dwindling fuel supply. Pete challenges Cory to make the call – turn back or keep going? In Greenland, Marcio and Kerry are going nowhere fast. A bureaucratic mix-up could force them to backtrack 1,000 kilometers. While they cool their heels, Marcio the foodie reluctantly dines out on some local cuisine… whale blubber.
13	5	"Down to Deadline"	February 8, 2014
Kerry and Marcio are in the final stretch of an 11,000 kilometer journey. Marcio has strict orders to make it home on time to his very pregnant wife. But Kerry has other ideas, that include a pit-stop at his hunting cabin for a little downtime with his buddies and steaks on the BBQ. Over in Iceland, Pete and Cory are paying for a wild night out with the locals. They need to make up time. But Pete can’t resist an opportunity to check something off his bucket list.
14	6	"Earning Your Stripes"	February 15, 2014
Marcio is back in his element – captaining a sleek, high-tech Phenom 300 jet from Florida all the way to Singapore. The trip is long but his real challenge is dealing with his new co-pilot. Lex is just 20 years old with 700 hours under his belt and runs a thriving brokerage business. Lex is hungry to impress, but Marcio is not cutting him any slack. Over in Europe, Pete and Cory take on one of the world’s shortest AND steepest runways. Then it’s down to Africa and a tense fuel stop in war-torn Sudan before final delivery in Kenya.
15	7	"Storms a Brewin'"	February 22, 2014
Tension is thick in the cockpit between Marcio and rookie co-pilot Lex. They’ve crossed almost 7,000 km of ocean together but Lex is still no closer to earning Marcio’s respect. Lex faces another challenge when a new pilot takes Lex’s place in the cockpit. Amaury is more experienced and he’s also vying for Marcio’s seal of approval. Down in South America, Kerry has met his match – his 18–year-old daughter, Claire. She knows her way around a plane and is as bull-headed as her dad. Now, for the first time, they must work as a team to deliver a Bonanza across jungle and ocean all the way up to the U.S.
16	8	"Ground Turbulence"	March 1, 2014
Stu and Brad team up for the first time to deliver a Beech 1900 on an epic journey from South Africa to Canada. But it’s a rocky start for both the plane and the new pilot match-up. After clearing an intense storm over the Amazon, Kerry and his daughter Claire decide to see the jungle up close with a local guide. But the survival skills they learn on the forest floor do nothing to prepare them for the trouble they get into with the Federales back at the airport.
17	9	"Throttle Forward"	March 8, 2014
The pilots reunite in Montreal, Canada to swap stories, clear the air and even settle some scores. The rookies get a work over and even the seasoned pros have some explaining to do about what REALLY happened out there. It’s a behind the scenes perspective on the pilots like you’ve never seen them before – and a sneak peek at what’s in store in the season’s grand finale!
18	10	"Fight to the Finish"	March 15, 2014
Kerry worries he’ll wind up in jail after a run-in with gun-toting Federales in Brazil. Over in Malawi, Brad and Stu lose time struggling with mysterious mechanical problems on the Beech. With Africa finally behind them, it’s a tense showdown between Brad and boss Cory over fuel costs. The troubles don’t end there. For both teams, it’s a relentless race to deliver the planes to the owners on time.

== Incidents ==
On 24 February 2013, cameraman/director John Driftmier and conservationist Dr. Anthony King were killed in a plane crash in Kenya. Driftmier was shooting footage for Dangerous Flights when the plane, an Aeroprakt A-22L ultralight (registration 5Y-LWF) crashed into the east face of Mount Kenya. Although only a preliminary report has been published thus far, it is believed that a large downdraft forced the ultralight into an unrecoverable descent into the mountain. Driftmier and King were the only occupants.

== Broadcast Airings ==
Repeats of the series are currently airing on the digital broadcast network Quest.

== See also ==
- Flying Wild Alaska
- Ice Pilots NWT
- Alaska Wing Men
- Bush Pilots (TV series)
- Mayday (TV Series)
