= List of Ice Pilots NWT episodes =

The following is a list of episodes of the television series Ice Pilots NWT. The show premiered on November 18, 2009 on History Television in Canada, in May 2011 on Quest in the UK, and on the National Geographic Channel in the US on April 22, 2011.

== Seasons ==
| Season | Episodes | Channel | Airdate |
|---|---|---|---|
| Season 1 | 13 | History Television | November 18, 2009 – February 13, 2010 |
| Season 2 | 13 | History Television | January 12, 2011 – April 6, 2011 |
| Season 3 | 13 | History Television | October 12, 2011 – January 19, 2012 |
| Season 4 | 13 | History Television | November 7, 2012 – February 6, 2013 |
| Season 5 | 13 | History Television | October 23, 2013 – January 29, 2014 |
| Season 6 | 8 | History Television | October 29, 2014 – December 17, 2014 |

== Season 1 (2009–2010) ==
| No. overall | No. in season | Title | Original release date |
|---|---|---|---|
| 1 | 1 | "Buffalo Air" | 18 November 2009 |
A day in the life at Buffalo Airways, as a rookie co-pilot faces an emergency landing, a hot-shot young flyer gets thrown into the hot seat and the boss' son gets in hot water. Co-pilot Scott Blue slogs it out on the Buffalo ramp to prep the vintage Curtiss C-46 Commando for its daily supply run. He's anxious to build more flying time to get the experience he needs to become a captain. And finally, he gets to fly with captain AJ Decoste. But the trip turns into much more than either of them bargained for, when a faltering engine and low fog force one of the toughest landings of their lives. Meanwhile, new arrival Alex Wagner, up north to learn to fly the Douglas DC-4, must prove himself when Buffalo's chief pilot gives him control of the 20-ton plane for the very first time. And long-suffering Mikey McBryan must redeem himself when a breakdown with his father's Douglas DC-3 forces Joe to call the backup plane into service—but it is nowhere near ready.
| 2 | 2 | "Pre-Christmas Rush" | 25 November 2009 |
It's the Christmas season and the northern communities depend on Buffalo more than ever to fly in food and supplies. But the engine in the C-46 seizes up in the tiny town of Norman Wells, stranding Scott and AJ and causing a chain reaction that pushes the whole company to the breaking point. Crusty mechanic Chuck Adams faces the challenge of replacing the entire engine—bare-handed in the −30 °C (−22 °F) deep freeze—on the remote tarmac. Back at the Yellowknife hangar, tempers flare as cargo manager Kelly Jurasevich is pushed to the breaking point to re-route the Christmas food and goods. But when the landing gear on the backup C-46 gets stuck, captain Devan Brooks must turn back. Yet Joe presses Mikey in no uncertain terms; they've got to get the goods out somehow.
| 3 | 3 | "Birthday from Hell" | 2 December 2009 |
It is chief pilot Arnie Schreder's birthday, and he and Scott take Kelly along for her first ride on the daily C-46 supply run. Kelly wants to meet Buffalo's clients—especially to soothe feelings after the Christmas cargo dustup. But a string of bad luck threatens to spoil the day—and the naughty birthday surprise Kelly has waiting back at the hangar. Ramp hand (or "rampie") Jeremy Dow is desperate to move up the ranks and out of the numbing grunt work he's had to endure for the past four months. But when new rampie Audrey Marchand's enthusiasm and "can-do" attitude impresses boss Joe, Jeremy realizes she may just jump the queue. And after the crew works all night to install gas tanks in the DC-4, hotshot new co-pilot Alex joins captain Justin Simle on a tricky fuel haul. Along the way, he grabs the chance to execute his first take-off, and get in some rare "low flying" over the spectacular northern landscape.
| 4 | 4 | "A Big Deal" | 9 December 2009 |
To move up from "rampie" to co-pilot at Buffalo, you first need to become a flight attendant. And Jeremy is determined to make it onto the next course—and beat co-worker Audrey into the co-pilot's seat. But first he has to find a way to ensure his India (Kanpur)-born protégé, the underweight and hardworking Raman Srivastava, can stick it out in Hay River alone. When a power failure leaves Rankin Inlet exposed to the brutal northern elements, DC-4 captain Justin must pull out the stops to try to get two massive generators up to the remote community before sundown. And when the recession nips at "Buffalo" Joe's heels, he organizes a $7-million sale of two Canadair CL-215 waterbombers to the Turkish government. A delegation arrives to seal the deal. With so much money on the line, will the contract close, or will the eccentric Joe say something to screw it up, as his son Mikey fears?
| 5 | 5 | "40/40/40" | 16 December 2009 |
Captain Devan and co-pilot Scott are best buddies and roommates. But when they encounter the menace of wind shear at notorious Bear Rock, the hair-raising experience tests their friendship. Engineer Adam Smith must gut it out in minus 40 when he and AJ find themselves with a broken engine push rod on a remote airstrip. And now that the Turkish waterbomber deal has gone through, it's up to lead mechanic Cory Dodd to turn two lightweight, summertime planes into aircraft able to withstand the rigours of a North Atlantic flight in the middle of winter. Then he has to get back to Yellowknife to see his wife Sonja for an important rendezvous before the dangerous journey that will keep them apart for months.
| 6 | 6 | "On the Move" | 23 December 2009 |
Joe's daughter Kathy is getting married in Las Vegas and Mikey has persuaded his father to take time off for the first time in seven years. Mikey does his best to make sure everything is covered while they're away. But when Joe gets back he finds that a charter has slipped through the cracks. Arnie and Justin are in Red Deer doing test flights for the risky journey to Turkey, and there's no one to fly the job. Joe personally flies to Red Deer to vent his anger—and haul Justin back. Justin's task is to move an impatient client, his dog and all his worldly possessions to the remote northern community of Paulatuk. But weather conditions are not cooperating and time is ticking to get Justin back and bound for Turkey. Meanwhile, Devan takes girlfriend Jynelle Glenn dog sledding for her birthday—and to talk over his upcoming interview for a job flying for the UN in Africa, leaving them both uncertain what the offer might mean for their future.
| 7 | 7 | "Suspension" | 30 December 2009 |
A bombshell hits "Buffalo" Joe. Because he fired his flight attendant manager, the Government of Canada serve him with a suspension for not having the proper supervision. The DC-3, which he's proudly flown for 20 years, cannot leave the ground with passengers on board. It's also a setback for Jeremy and the other rampies: no flight attendant manager means no training course and no chance for anyone to move up. Then an unexpected injury delivers an even worse twist of fate. But for the Turkey team, it's finally a go. After an emotional sendoff, Arnie, Justin and the waterbomber crew set off on the first leg of their journey: a risky trip across Canada in the dead of winter-with no de-icing equipment.
| 8 | 8 | "Cause for Celebration" | 6 January 2010 |
After the Turkey crew arrives in Newfoundland, Cory discovers a potentially dangerous leak in the fuel lines. Anxious about their limited window to depart safely, he stays behind from the cold-water survival course to fix it, while Arnie, Justin and the other pilots press on. The course is sobering; the stark dangers of what they are about to do are sinking in. Then, tragedy. A helicopter crashes off the coast of Newfoundland. Ironically, the raging winds hampering rescue efforts give the Buffalo boys their long-awaited tailwind. Will they chance the treacherous North Atlantic crossing? Back in Yellowknife, cranky mechanic Chuck tries his damndest to prep the Electra for a fuel haul to Baker Lake, but gets foiled at every turn. Mikey, seeking a way to show his affection for his undemonstrative father, tries to make a cake for Joe's 65th birthday - even though he's never baked. And the Buffalo gang convene at the Ice Castle for AJ and Candace's wedding.
| 9 | 9 | "Transatlantic Crossing" | 13 January 2010 |
On the edge of the continent, the Turkey crew fights icing danger to make the critical jump over the North Atlantic to Santa Maria in the Azores. But the next day, en route to Portugal, crew #2's right engine fails. With a plane full of slopping fuel and no power on one engine, it will take all of their ingenuity and experience to get back into Santa Maria, where the airport is on full emergency alert. In Yellowknife, Mikey and Scott page through piles of resumes to search for another trained pilot willing to endure initiation as a Buffalo rampie. Jeremy's mood plummets even further as Audrey and new threat Wilf Darr seem sure to pass him.
| 10 | 10 | "Thin Ice" | 20 January 2010 |
Joe gets a lucrative late-season contract to fly mining equipment to an airstrip on a frozen lake, sending C-46 and DC-4 crews on a race against the spring melt. But conflict erupts between Devan and a senior pilot. And when the client reports an on-site incident, Joe goes on the warpath. Though Jeremy has missed a number of flight attendant classes, he's confident he can catch up to fellow rampies Audrey and Wilf. But too much confidence just may be a dangerous thing. And over the North Atlantic, Arnie, Justin and Cory press on to Turkey, even though they have only half of the spare parts in their plane. But there are some serious volcanoes and busy Mediterranean air traffic ahead.
| 11 | 11 | "The Crash" | 27 January 2010 |
Across the world in spectacular İzmir, after thousands of hours of painstaking preparation and life-risking flying, an unfortunate accident devastates the Turkey crew - and everyone at Buffalo Airways. In Yellowknife, the spring melt is well underway, and northerners are finding ways to celebrate, from checking out the melting waterfalls to racing jet boats onto the remaining river ice. It's also Wilf's first run as flight attendant on the DC-3 - for which he insists on wearing a shirt and tie to the consternation of the entire company. It's the final push Jeremy needs to move to HQ in Yellowknife. Kelly and Jynelle dig up a house-warming surprise that practically brings tears to the gruff rampie's eyes. But has the move come too late to do him any good?
| 12 | 12 | "Change of Seasons" | 3 February 2010 |
Cargo manager (and unofficial Buffalo den mother) Kelly has problems enough when Jynelle's holiday leaves her shorthanded. But when her engineer husband Juan quits on the spot after a blowout with Joe, Kelly is left in a terrible position. Will Kelly stay - or will she go? And after nine months of brutal work and tough luck, Jeremy sees light at the end of the tunnel. Buffalo needs a new DC-3 co-pilot, and contrary to expectation, he's getting a crack at it. But first, he's got to pass the test of flying with Joe.
| 13 | 13 | "Up in the Air" | 13 February 2010 |
A leaded aviation fuel shortage is created when sales are limited to only firefighting aircraft. Former Buffalo employee Juan gets a new position with a rival company; after much reflection his wife Kelly decides to stay with Buffalo, putting her dreams of purchasing a farm on hold. Jeremy misses an important Sunday shift in the warehouse, getting him into major trouble with Joe. Scott gets bad news: he must stand down from flying so that a rival co-pilot can be fast-tracked to captain. Scott pulls out all the stops to secure a new contract flying north from Eureka, a tiny research station near the North Pole. But Scott's rival is also interested in co-piloting the C-46, if Buffalo lands the Eureka contract. Mikey and Joe figure out how to honor a late RCAF DC-3 mechanic's last wishes, to have his ashes scattered from a DC-3.

== Season 2 (2011) ==
| No. overall | No. in season | Title | Original release date |
|---|---|---|---|
| 14 | 1 | "Frozen Four" | 12 January 2011 |
Buffalo Airways is hired to fly a back-up generator from Gjoa Haven to Whale Cove, but encounter weather problems on the way. Joe meets with his lawyers to discuss possibly fighting a fine issued by Transport Canada.
| 15 | 2 | "Fire and Ice" | 19 January 2011 |
When a deadly fire destroys a northern outpost a week before Christmas, Buffalo puts everything aside to come to the rescue. Cargo Manager Kelly receives a shocking diagnosis that renews her fight to quit smoking. And new father AJ balances a captain's life with new responsibilities.
| 16 | 3 | "Under Pressure" | 26 January 2011 |
The curse of -40 hits Buffalo pilots Devan and Scott on a food mail flight up the Mackenzie Valley when a mysterious rise in oil pressure threatens to destroy one of the C-46's engines. Rookie pilots Andrew and Graeme face the test they've been working toward for years – getting "checked out" as DC-3 co-pilots. And when Jynelle gets pulled back into running Buffalo's cargo operations during her school exams, it's a recipe for a meltdown.
| 17 | 4 | "The Right Stuff" | 2 February 2011 |
Mikey goes on a treasure hunt to Venezuela for a rare CL-215 waterbomber. Cargo Manager Kelly's stress levels hit a new high when she returns from her Mexican vacation in even worse health than when she left. And new pilots Andrew and Graeme face the toughest test of their young careers – flying with irascible Buffalo boss Joe McBryan.
| 18 | 5 | "The River Lift" | 9 February 2011 |
The Mackenzie River ferry is closed and Buffalo provides charter flights to move vital goods. An RCMP officer enlists Buffalo to move from a northern police detachment to another. Rod and Sasha McBryan see their baby in womb using 3D ultrasound.
| 19 | 6 | "Don't Muck with Chuck" | 16 February 2011 |
Mechanic Chuck Adams tries to load a cargo that appears to be too wide for the Electra heading towards the high Arctic, at least according to the pilot and the charts. Former flight attendant Audrey returns and gets a seat to fly with Buffalo Joe on the sched.
| 20 | 7 | "The Finish Line" | 23 February 2011 |
A C46 is dispatched to the far north but the brand new engine uses oil at an alarming rate, sending Devan, Scott and Adam back to Yellowknife. However, the replacement C46 has high fuel burn and requires the pilots to conserve fuel to return to Yellowknife. Meanwhile, a DC-3 with Audrey on board goes to pick up dogsled team athletes from a community in Nunavut to Grande Prairie, Alberta for the 2010 Arctic Winter Games. Audrey decides to stay and watch the games.
| 21 | 8 | "Ski Plane" | 2 March 2011 |
The last time a Buffalo DC-3 was on skis was more than 10 years ago. Now, young pilots AJ and Andrew get to learn from chief pilot Arnie how to takeoff and land a DC-3 with skis. But with the frozen airstrip's ice melting fast, it will be up to them to get the job done safely. At the same time, the Mackenzie Valley food service contract is up for renewal, putting many jobs at Buffalo, including cargo manager Kelly, on the line.
| 22 | 9 | "Buffalo Scores" | 9 March 2011 |
Buffalo scores the charter of a lifetime when they're asked to transport the Stanley Cup on a tour of the north. Cup fever spreads quickly around Buffalo, and for Mikey, what begins as an innocent love for this hockey icon soon becomes an obsession. Meanwhile, a Transport Canada violation forces Joe to give up his licence for 10 days. He reluctantly looks for a captain to replace him on the passenger run he's flown for almost 30 years.
| 23 | 10 | "Special Delivery" | 16 March 2011 |
Chief Pilot Arnie lands the DC-3 on a homemade sand strip at a remote lodge. Electra expert Chuck goes one-on-one with a stubborn power unit, and Rod's wife Sasha goes into labour with the newest member of the McBryan family.
| 24 | 11 | "Yukon" | 23 March 2011 |
When thunderstorms and a shaking engine threaten a DC-3 charter to Whitehorse, Joe pulls out all the stops to get the passengers to their destination. Patient C-46 co-pilot Scott Blue finally gets his crack at the DC-4, and the newest member of the McBryan dynasty, baby Emma Rae, makes her first visit to the Buffalo hangar.
| 25 | 12 | "British Invasion" | 30 March 2011 |
A potential Electra purchase in Coventry, England has Joe showing Mikey the ropes of international business. The C-46 experiences engine trouble and is forced to land on an isolated island.
| 26 | 13 | "Arnie Calls It" | 6 April 2011 |
The McBryan family takes a vacation to AirVenture in Oshkosh, Wisconsin to celebrate the 75th anniversary of the DC-3. Chief Pilot Arnie gets pilots up to speed on the CL-215 waterbombers and makes a tough career decision.

== Season 3 (2011 - 2012) ==
| No. overall | No. in season | Title | Original release date |
|---|---|---|---|
| 27 | 1 | "Under New Management" | 12 October 2011 |
Joe hires outsider Duane Hicks to help Buffalo navigate the future and coach Mikey. Gord and Sean's DC-3 delivery mission to the High Arctic goes awry when blizzard conditions and a broken oil cooler force an emergency landing.
| 28 | 2 | "Dambusters" | 19 October 2011 |
A behind the scenes look at the Operation Chastise recreation and its bouncing bomb, and the UK documentary Dambusters: Building the Bouncing Bomb, Canadian documentary Dambusters Fly Again, Nova season 39 episode "Bombing Hitler's Dams". Arnie returns to pilot the DC-4 used in the recreation.
| 29 | 3 | "Chuck Walks" | 26 October 2011 |
Critical of the many stops and starts in the Electra program, and frustrated with the constant drama at Buffalo, Chuck quits. Joe clashes with the maintenance department when a series of delays puts the sale of an old Canso waterbomber in jeopardy. Mikey goes on an ATV hunting trip and Rod babysits his daughter, Emma Rae, while his wife Sasha goes to a wine gala in town.
| 30 | 4 | "Gear Up, Gear Down" | 2 November 2011 |
Frustrated with her lack of flying and stuck in a rut as a courier driver, Audrey decides her time at Buffalo is over. Devan, Ian and Jimmy deal with a hydraulic fluid leak in the C-46 on the valley run, which forces Jimmy to crawl into the "hell hole" and crank down the landing gear by hand.
| 31 | 5 | "Big Boost" | 16 November 2011 |
When a ferry breakdown causes a gasoline shortage in Yellowknife, new manager Duane begs Chuck to return and prepare the Electra for a fuel haul. Cory leads a clandestine rescue mission to retrieve an abandoned C-46 and Mikey escapes to Ottawa for a birthday joyride in a fighter jet.
| 32 | 6 | "Power Struggle" | 23 November 2011 |
Duane lands a huge contract for the Electra and puts enormous pressure on mechanic Adam to prep the plane without the help of his mentor Chuck. Kelly plans her Mexican wedding, but Jynelle's sudden resignation leaves her in the lurch. The power goes out in Yellowknife, spurring Joe into crisis mode.
| 33 | 7 | "Top of the World" | 30 November 2011 |
The Electra flies to Alert, the northernmost settlement on Earth, forcing Adam and new senior manager Duane to work things out. Hay River rampie Tyler is on the fast track to a co-pilot seat, but first has to prove his flying ability to Buffalo's new chief pilot, Justin.
| 34 | 8 | "Last Days" | 7 December 2011 |
Sparks fly when Joe discovers Gord has taken a job with a rival airline after completing expensive training on one of the Buffalo planes. Larry, a rookie rampie, makes a near fatal error while training on the C-46. A desperate search is launched for elusive C-46 parts.
| 35 | 9 | "Push Comes to Shove" | 14 December 2011 |
Trying to make his mark at Buffalo, Duane lands two more Electra contracts. But his over-zealous efforts result in a clash with the crew and with Joe, and a down-to-the-wire midnight departure to meet a deadline. Rookie DC-3 co-pilot Tyler discovers that landing the big plane takes practice.
| 36 | 10 | "The Dog House" | 21 December 2011 |
Duane's decision to leave the Electra crew unsupervised while he spends time at home jeopardizes the completion of a major contract, and could cost him his job. Young DC-3 co-pilot Graeme sees his chance to move up to a bigger plane disappear when he falls out of favour with Joe.
| 37 | 11 | "Ice Strip" | 4 January 2012 |
Mechanic Jimmy is sent to a northern mining camp to create an ice landing strip on a remote lake where AJ will have to land a DC-3 and the much bigger C-46. New co-pilot Tyler faces the ultimate test – flying the sked with Joe. And Mikey turns the Buffalo hangar into a playhouse for his niece's first birthday.
| 38 | 12 | "Expect the Unexpected" | 11 January 2012 |
Engine troubles on the C-46 during the valley run force Devan to shut down an engine. High winds wreak havoc for Devan and his crew on another C-46 mission to help clean up an oil spill in the Northwest Territories. Scott trains on a CL-215 waterbomber and visits his mentor Arnie, then joins the waterbombing crews when Buffalo is called in to fight a massive fire in Alberta.
| 39 | 13 | "Coming Home" | 18 January 2012 |
Rookie waterbomber pilot Scott gets his first taste of action when Buffalo responds to an emergency callout to fight fires in Alberta. Mikey and Rod think they hit the jackpot when they buy a million dollar firefighting plane on eBay at a bargain price. Joe marks his 50 years of flying by returning to the place he grew up in his historic Norseman. And Arnie shows up in Yellowknife to cheer on daughter Kaitlyn in a cancer fundraiser.

== Season 4 (2012 - 2013) ==
| No. overall | No. in season | Title | Original release date |
|---|---|---|---|
| 40 | 1 | "Dark Skies" | 7 November 2012 |
When Yellowknife and the northern aviation community are rocked by three crashes in the space of a month, Joe places an extra emphasis on safety, which is why he only trusts himself to perform a dangerous-looking DC3 stunt landing for a visiting film crew. While new rampie Ryan tries to hack it in Hay River, Toronto dental hygienist Christine visits Buffalo for a trial run on the ramp – and gets thrown into the DC4 hot seat.
| 41 | 2 | "Shut Down" | 14 November 2012 |
Joe receives a negative visit from Transport Canada when inspectors threaten to shut down the airline. Ray and the Electra crew fly to Sachs Harbour to pick up a unique load - the hides, wool, and meat of 250 musk oxen. Canadian Prime Minister Stephen Harper visits Buffalo to admire its vintage planes. Mikey works out with fitness trainer Tara and sets his sights on competing in a 45km snowshoe marathon.
| 42 | 3 | "A Tale of Two Pilots" | 21 November 2012 |
Weighed down by the responsibility of training a new rampie, and struggling to get out of Joe's doghouse, DC3 co-pilot Tyler gets a once in a lifetime opportunity to stunt fly in his Cessna 150 for a visiting film crew. Meanwhile another Buffalo co-pilot, Andrew, is up for a job with Cathay Pacific Airlines. The last time a pilot left, Joe took it personally. How will he react to the news that Andrew might be leaving?
| 43 | 4 | "Ice Jam" | 28 November 2012 |
After taking command of an intense airlift, and dealing with the ugliest Electra load he's ever seen, Scott takes a scary fall on the icy tarmac. City girl Christine moves to Yellowknife to give the unglamorous rampie life a shot, firebrand mechanic Chuck returns to the Buffalo hangar and immediately stirs the pot, while Joe helps out an old friend, "Ice Road Trucker" Alex Debogorski.
| 44 | 5 | "A Very Buffalo Christmas" | 5 December 2012 |
A week before Christmas, Buffalo agrees to lend a hand to an RCMP initiative to fly toys to isolated communities in the north. But a series of problems with the Electra leave the company in a jam. An excess of holiday freight overwhelms cargo manager Kelly, and despite a visit from her buddy Arnie Schreder, recovering from his cancer treatment, her stress peaks after a clash with Joe.
| 45 | 6 | "Crash Landing" | 12 December 2012 |
Lockheed Electra C-FBAQ is used on a cargo flight (Buffalo flight 1105) to a rough ice strip at Goose Lake. The Electra is not designed for rough field operations. On approach to the ice strip, the rightlanding gear lowers sluggishly. On return to Yellowknife, the gear fails to descend, forcing a crash landing using just the left main gear and nose gear.
| 46 | 7 | "For Sale By Owner" | 19 December 2012 |
When South Korean buyers come to Buffalo to look at a water bomber, the pressure is on mechanic Cory to get the plane ready. But a landing gear emergency puts him and chief pilot Justin in serious danger. Rod and Mikey salivate over a fleet of P3 Orion water bombers up for auction at a California fire fighting conference.
| 47 | 8 | "Over Seas" | 2 January 2013 |
A CL-215 water bomber needs to go to buyers in Korea. So Justin and Cory fly the plane to Vancouver Harbour, where it will be hoisted onto a cargo ship sailing across the Pacific Ocean to its destination – a method of delivery no one has ever tried. Flight attendant David is fast-tracked to a seat next to Joe on the DC-3 sked. But Joe's been on the warpath, and is known for being hard on rookie co-pilots.
| 48 | 9 | "Water Wings" | 9 January 2013 |
In South Korea, Cory and Justin meet the ship delivering Buffalo's water bomber plane to new buyers there. But the boys are frustrated by the buyers' poor planning. Tempers flare when they try to get the plane off the ship and delivered to its final destination, Sacheon, South Korea. After taking part in a military paratrooper jump, Mikey brings in fashion model Kate Eaton to join his team for the Frostbite 45 snowshoe marathon.
| 49 | 10 | "Meltdown" | 16 January 2013 |
As spring arrives and Ray's retirement day approaches, Sean surprises everyone by leaving Buffalo for a job with the competition. So Buffalo brings in Electra pilot Brian Harrison to finish the contract. But as ice strip conditions deteriorate, each flight is riskier than the last. When Buffalo gets the news of former chief pilot Arnie Schreder's passing, Justin flies a DC3 to pick up Arnie's family in Kelowna and brings them back to Yellowknife for a special memorial remembering the aviation legend.
| 50 | 11 | "North Atlantic Convoy" | 23 January 2013 |
Greenland's Narsarsuaq airport – known as one of the world's most dangerous approaches – looms on the horizon as Cory and Justin begin a trans-global journey to deliver two CL-215 water bombers to Turkey. Christine pushes to become a DC3 co-pilot, but Joe throws a wrench into her plan. Mikey travels to Denmark, for the new Polarland attraction at the Legoland theme park, featuring exhibits inspired by Buffalo Airways, including Lego versions of Joe and Mikey.
| 51 | 12 | "Sunk" | 30 January 2013 |
Joe and Mikey hire a helicopter for a salvage mission to retrieve the rare tailpiece from a Lockheed plane that crashed in the Yellowknife woods forty years ago. It's a personal quest for Joe; he flew that plane at the beginning of his career. Justin and Cory battle severe icing that threatens to send them plummeting into the frigid North Atlantic on the longest ocean leg of their CL-215 water bomber journey to Turkey.
| 52 | 13 | "Turkey or Bust" | 6 February 2013 |
Iron Maiden lead singer Bruce Dickinson pilots Buffalo's planes; Mikey flies in a CF-18 fighter jet; Justin and Cory finish their journey to Turkey.

== Season 5 (2013 - 2014) ==
| No. overall | No. in season | Title | Original release date |
|---|---|---|---|
| 53 | 1 | "Cold Start" | 23 October 2013 |
Mikey gets the opportunity of a lifetime when he's invited to host a classroom discussion with Commander Chris Hadfield, calling in from the International Space Station. But reality soon hits, when the first blast of a record-cold winter grounds the DC-4, causing a major backup and grief for new cargo manager Chris Staples. When Mikey dispatches the C-46 to save the mission, it suffers a landing gear collapse on the runway, forcing the entire staff to scramble – with no word on the state of the flight crew.
| 54 | 2 | "Shootout" | 30 October 2013 |
Buffalo Airways is still reeling from the recent accident especially mechanic Chuck. Mikey tries to lift spirits by setting up a hockey shootout against a squad of NHL players that the airline is transporting around the north. He drafts a team and Buffalos best players; including Chuck, test their shots against Ottawa goalie Craig Anderson. Young DC-3 co-pilot David flies farther north than he’s ever been, facing a mysterious landing gear problem on approach to a remote Arctic airstrip. When his captain gets flustered, the rookie must keep his cool.
| 55 | 3 | "Snowplane" | 6 November 2013 |
Joe races a quirky antique snowmobile, that history seems to have forgotten - with an airplane engine and no brakes. The water bomber crew struggles to get two planes out of Turkey. Cocky rampie Chris Staples tries to prove himself in the C-46.
| 56 | 4 | "Gear Lock" | 13 November 2013 |
A cold snap triggers massive challenges. Devan runs into gear problems while he ferries a mothballed DC-3 across the country. And Justin has to make a snap decision with his newborn son aboard his plane.
| 57 | 5 | "Aussie Ace" | 20 November 2013 |
The Electra crew tests out the plane that crash landed last year by landing on an ice strip while a hotshot Australian pilot tries for a job at Buffalo. Tyler works up the courage to confront Joe about a big decision.
| 58 | 6 | "Rock Stars and Rampies" | 27 November 2013 |
Facing Joe's wrath, Rod and Cory head to the UK to make urgent water bomber repairs. David tries to prove himself to Devan in the C-46 but ends up infuriating Devan. Will makes an ultimatum in Hay River.
| 59 | 7 | "Ice Camp" | 4 December 2013 |
Mikey trains for High Arctic survival with the Canadian Rangers. The Air Force invades Chuck's hangar. Joe faces tough competition at a California plane auction.
| 60 | 8 | "Frozen Solid" | 11 December 2013 |
AJ and James battle a DC-4 engine fire. It's Joe's 69th birthday - and he's never flown a helicopter before, so Mikey plans a special gift of chopper flight lessons.
| 61 | 9 | "Power Crash" | 18 December 2013 |
The Electra has become Buffalo's winter workhorse-the one plane they need to keep flying. During a High Arctic delivery mission, a 5,000-pound power unit tips off the forklift and crashes to the ground, smashing the fuselage, and sending Mikey into crisis management mode. With no backup Electras, Joe races to Atlantic Airways in Coventry, England on an urgent mission to scoop one up from other potential buyers while back at Buffalo, Mikey tries to prove he's really management material
| 62 | 10 | "Breakdown" | 8 January 2014 |
Co-pilot Graeme's fumbles his Electra training landings. Chris stresses over his C-46 check ride. Adam rescues a stranded C-46.
| 63 | 11 | "Target Practice" | 15 January 2014 |
The Electra is still working around the clock and Buffalo is ready to pick up another, the second of its new British acquisitions. Joe and Mikey head across the Atlantic to England to fly home their new baby, ending an era of British aviation. Devan preps for fire season with some wild target practice in the DC-4 to see if his aim lives up to his cockiness. When James' son enters the local soapbox derby, James builds a Buffalo-style racer and finds out how his ugly green machine stacks up against the slick and pretty competition.
| 64 | 12 | "Air Show" | 22 January 2014 |
Mikey and Joe visit the Hamilton air show where Mikey has planned a major surprise for Father's Day. Joe is going to ride along in a CT-114 Tutor Jet with the famous Snowbirds. While Joe prepares for the big event, Mikey decides to conquer his fear of heights. He travels down the highway to Toronto and tries out the CN Tower "Edgewalk." But he's determined to go even higher. After all the bonding he and Joe have done in Hamilton, Mikey takes his first pilot lesson with Joe as the teacher. It turns out there are some heights Mikey still fears. As spring warms up Yellowknife, a longtime member of the Buffalo family announces a surprise departure.
| 65 | 13 | "Five Seasons" | 29 January 2014 |
A look back at the last five years, a peek behind the camera, and reflections from the Buffalo crew.

== Season 6 (2014) ==
| No. overall | No. in season | Title | Original release date |
|---|---|---|---|
| 66 | 1 | "A Ball O'Snags" | 29 October 2014 |
C-46 (C-GTXW) has an engine fire during takeoff. To deliver Christmas freight up the Mackenzie Valley while the C-46 is down, Buffalo Joe decides to use the Electra. An Electra in Yellowknife has a cracked windshield and needs to be repaired. The other Electra is stored at Red Deer but it is full of issues after sitting outside the whole winter. Engineers scramble to get the planes fixed.
| 67 | 2 | "Ice Storm" | 5 November 2014 |
Northwest Territories is hit by the worst ice storm in years. Chief Pilot AJ Decoste flies an Electra newly bought from England to deliver goods up the Mackenzie Valley before the storm arrives. A new rampie from Ottawa is having a tough time to fit in with other rampies in Hay River. Watermain broke and froze the pipes at a Buffalo pilot's home, forcing the family members to stay in Mikey's house for a few days.
| 68 | 3 | "Old Dogs" | 12 November 2014 |
A tug towing a plane ran out of fuel on an active taxiway, sparking a heated discussion about refuelling responsibility between Joe, Mikey, and a rampie. Meanwhile, Joe has more things on his mind since Transport Canada conducted a surprise audit on the airline. Joe was given 72 hours to hand over the accountable executive position to another staff. Chuck just finished repairing an engine on a newly bought Electra but it broke again after just one flight. He has to quickly troubleshoot the engine trouble so that the Electra can deliver building supplies to RCMP outpost in Ulukhaktok. Joe's dog Sophie is found underneath a plane inside the hangar and can't stand up. Mikey and Joe know her time is up and have to make a tough decision.
| 69 | 4 | "Checkflight" | 19 November 2014 |
Joe is approaching 70 years old. He will lose his pilot license unless he passes the medical exam. He decides to fly to Arizona and do his check up. Meanwhile, two rampies who have worked in Buffalo's ramp for 9 months get a chance to do a check ride on a DC-3. But things may not go to plan as one of the rampies got food poisoning on the day of the check ride. The McBryan family ordered a birthday cake for Joe. The only problem? Joe is still in California on the day of his birthday and contemplating his future.
| 70 | 5 | "Second Chances" | 26 November 2014 |
Newly licensed DC-3 co-pilot Jeff Tapper had a rough landing that nearly skidded off the runway. While Jeff works on his landing skills on a flight simulator, rampie Prefkar is studying hard to prepare for his IATAR test. But Prefkhar's studying distracted himself from his courier delivery job when he accidentally left medical supplies that have "do not freeze" sticker on the box inside the delivery truck overnight, spoiling the medical contents. Prefkhar faces the consequence for his mistakes and his time at Buffalo may be running out. Kathy and her friend is trying to get a new dog for Joe from local SPCA. Joe decides to bring out the seldom-flown DC-3 (C-FCUE) to test Jeff and the new dog, Muffy. C-FCUE has a storied history. It was the first aircraft that landed in Yellowknife and carried Prime Minister Pierre Trudeau before. But C-FCUE's controls are different than most DC-3 aircraft in Buffalo's fleet. Can Jeff quickly learn to fly the plane to redeem himself and can Muffy withstand flying in the air and become Joe's new dog?
| 71 | 6 | "Big Plans, Bad Luck" | 3 December 2014 |
Prefkar gets a cold shoulder from Joe due to the earlier courier cargo incident. Mikey arranges a few opportunities for Prefkar to co-pilot DC-3 cargo flights but weather threatens to halt the flight before plane even gets in the air. While one of Buffalo's DC-3 (C-GWZS) is rumoured to have participated in D-Day invasion, Mikey finally gets confirmation and military record from a historian that it did participate by dropping paratroopers in Operation Tonga. Mikey decides to work with Royal Canadian Air Force to celebrate 70th anniversary of D-Day. He and Cory needs to prepare C-FWZS for an reenactment of paratropping and participate in the reenactment themselves. Working under a tight deadline, they need to search for parachuting parts that were removed from DC-3 many years ago. Mikey turns to online help while Cory searches for the parts stored inside the Red Deer maintenance hangar. At the same time, Mikey is trying to lose weight to avoid exceeding the maximum weight limit for tandem jump. Mikey and Cory finally find the crucial parachute jump part has always been inside the aircraft, covered by a canvas on the top of the cabin.
| 72 | 7 | "Dogfight" | 10 December 2014 |
The static line that Mikey and Cory installed stood up to military inspection. But the military demanded an emergency retrieval system in case a paratrooper's chute got stuck by the horizontal stabilizer, something that wasn't invented back in WWII. Mikey and Cory scrambles to jerry-rig a retrieval system from the local hardware store. Four Buffalo Airways pilots were given time off to participate in aerial dogfighting in SIAI-Marchetti SF.260 fighter plane. The victor will be crowned Buffalo's Top Gun.
| 73 | 8 | "D-Day" | 17 December 2014 |
Mikey received the military approval from Canada and US for the D-Day tribute jump after 2 years of planning. Mikey invited 12 Green Berets and 12 Canadian paratroopers to participate. The original drop zone determined by the military was along the Abraham Lake. Joe thinks it's too risky because all four sides were surrounded by high mountains and refuses to fly into there. At Mikey's insistence, they found an alternate drop zone at Bighorn River that Joe agrees to fly into. The first day of the planned jump was scrapped due to low visibility. They have to wait for the second and final day to attempt the jump.

== See also ==
- Alaska Wing Men
- Flying Wild Alaska
- Ice Road Truckers
