= Regional Animal Protection Society =

Canadian non-profit organization

Regional Animal Protection Society (RAPS)
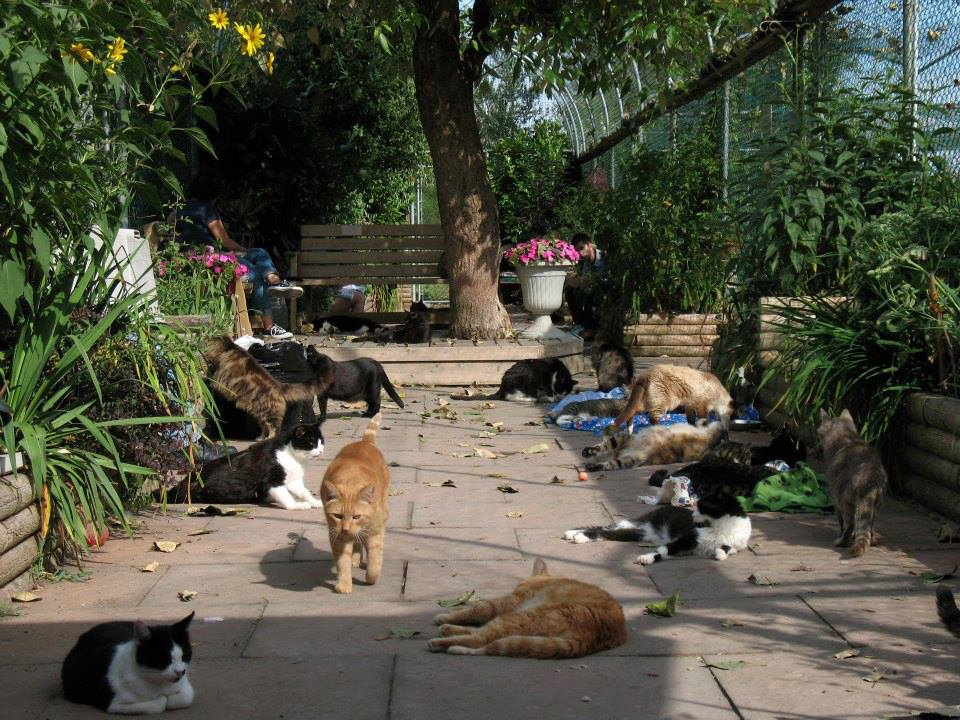
- Founded: 1989
- Type: non-profit charity
- Purpose: No kill animal sheltering, trap-neuter-return
- Location: Richmond, British Columbia, Canada
- Region served: British Columbia
- Revenue: $6.16 million in 2023
- Employees: 65 full-time, 32 part-time in 2023
- Volunteers: 550
- Website: rapsbc.com

Regional Animal Protection Society (RAPS) is a no kill animal services agency in Richmond, British Columbia, Canada. RAPS operates the RAPS Cat Sanctuary (Canada's largest such facility), a fostering network, social enterprise thrift stores, and the RAPS Animal Hospital, a full-service animal clinic.

RAPS was founded in 1989 as Richmond Homeless Cats. It was registered as a nonprofit organization with the Province of British Columbia in 1995. In 2007, it was renamed the Richmond Animal Protection Society. In 2017, it was renamed the Regional Animal Protection Society to reflect the geographic reach of its programs and services.

== History ==
In 1989, a small group of volunteers founded the Richmond Animal Protection Society (then Richmond Homeless Cats), the first organization in the Richmond area helping feral cats. At the time, feral cats were quickly killed upon entering local animal control pounds. Volunteers started to do trap–neuter–return of feral cats, including fostering and taming feral kittens, and fostering tame cats for adoption. There were soon 43 feeding stations for feral cats tended each day in Richmond and south Vancouver.

In 1999, space was donated for a shelter, which became the location of a cat sanctuary. To try to reduce the number of homeless pets, the organization subsidized spay/neuter surgery for low-income pet owners, helped people recover lost pets, and offered solutions to behavioural problems.

Determined to end needless euthanasia of animals, the organization bid on the municipal animal shelter contract in 2006. On February 1, 2007, RAPS took over operation of the City of Richmond animal shelter and implemented a no-kill policy for the animals regardless of age, medical needs or adoptability. The organization reports on its website that the "implementation of our no-kill philosophy has been very successful and we are finding safe and loving homes for hundreds of shelter animals."

By early 2012, in five years of running the municipal shelter, RAPS had "handled more than 2,000 dogs, 1,800 cats, 300 rabbits, 50 farm animals, 350 small animals (like birds, reptiles and ferrets) and temporarily housed 1,500 injured wildlife."

In 2018, RAPS opened the RAPS Animal Hospital, a full-service, community-owned veterinary hospital. The facility was officially opened by Richmond Mayor Malcolm Brodie and other dignitaries. Since opening, the RAPS Animal Hospital has provided more than $7 million in subsidized care to animals in the community.

The Richmond Animal Protection Society (RAPS) is a registered charity that operates the RAPS Adoption and Education Centre, one of Canada's largest cat sanctuaries, social enterprise thrift stores, the community-owned RAPS Animal Hospital, and an education and advocacy arm. RAPS is the subject of the docuseries Pets & Pickers. RAPS is a no-kill organization.

== No-Kill Promise ==
As a no-kill animal-serving organization, RAPS asserts:

Under our care, no animal is ever euthanized due to lack of space, treatable illness, physical defect, age, or behavioural or socialization issues.

Animals in RAPS care are euthanized in situations where they are, or are imminently likely to be, experiencing intolerable pain and face no likelihood of recovery. On rare occasions, due to its contracted responsibilities to provide animal care and control services in the City of Richmond, RAPS is required by court order to euthanize an animal that has been declared dangerous.

== Ban on retail pet sales ==
RAPS worked with the city to ban the sale of rabbits and dogs from pet stores.

The sale of rabbits was banned on April 1, 2010. A city councillor stated that extending the ban to dogs was "a first step in sending a message to puppy mills and will reduce the number of dogs surrendered to shelters". RAPS had noted "a steady stream of surrendered dogs, originally bought from pet stores, whose owners lose interest once their purchases outgrow the cute puppy stage." The bylaw prohibiting sales of dogs went into effect on April 30, 2011, and survived a court challenge from pet stores.

== Cat Sanctuary ==
The cat sanctuary, located on six acres (2.4 hectares) of suburban farmland, has been described as "Club Med for cats". There are two main buildings and twelve smaller ones, including a kitten house and two houses for cats with the feline immunodeficiency virus. Another area is provided for cats with the feline leukemia virus. "Enclosed decks on the main buildings provide indoor cats with access to fresh air and sunshine", while the "fenced outer yards and cedar cottages provide a safe haven and home to more than 200 cats who prefer an outdoor life."

At its peak in the early 2000s, the sanctuary provided a home to more than 800 cats. In 2014, the sanctuary housed approximately 640 cats, and is maintained by about 100 volunteers. "The cats' health is monitored by a highly specialized team of animal care workers who have been trained to handle and medicate feral cats, and who work closely with local veterinarians."

The cat sanctuary is funded by private donations and revenues from the RAPS thrift store.
