= Pets & Pickers =

Docuseries that follows a Canadian animal hospital

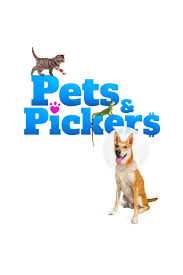
- Genre: Docuseries
- Created by: Tyson Hepburn
- Directed by: Tyson Hepburn; Andrew Vacheresse
- Narrated by: Lucia Walters
- Country of origin: Canada
- Original language: English
- No. of seasons: 2
- No. of episodes: 16

Production
- Executive producer: Tyson Hepburn
- Production company: Tyson Media Productions

Original release
- Network: Discovery Channel
- Release: May 12, 2022 – present

Pets & Pickers is a docuseries that follows a Canadian animal hospital, the Regional Animal Protection Society (RAPS) in Richmond, British Columbia. Pets & Pickers premiered on Discovery Channel (Canada) on May 12, 2022, and later premiered in the United States on Animal Planet on February 18, 2023. It was renewed for a second season, which premiered on May 6, 2023.

== Synopsis ==
At the RAPS hospital, pets receive urgent care, even when owners can't afford it. The hospital owns two thrift stores, and sales supplement the cost of care. A dedicated team of picking specialists also sort through abandoned storage bins to find valuables to pay for surgeries.

== Cast ==
- Eyal Litchman – Executive Director at RAPS
- Karen Kamachi – Thrift Store Manager
- Jamie Anstey — Picker
- Marty Kramer – Picker
- .Amy Spottiswald — Picker
- Dr. Regan Schwartz – Vet
- Dr. Alex Maldonado – Vet
- Dr. Satveer Dadrwal – Vet
- Dr. Marius Vasilescu – Vet
- Dr. Victoria Cruz-Mendez – Vet

== Episodes ==
=== Season 1 ===
- Episode 101 – "Pets, Pickers & Problems": Dexter the dog has severe breathing problems. Owner Michelle travels hours in the hope that RAPS can help pay for urgent surgery. The dedicated team of pickers counting on abandoned storage locker goods to fund the veterinary bills gets a nasty surprise. Halo the Chihuahua discovers more than exercise in the local dog park.
- Episode 102 – "Urgent Care Fur All": A Chihuahua named Rue and Axel, a young boy with cerebral palsy, are both counting on RAPS to get to the bottom of Rue's leg injury. Having drained his savings, owner Ken is on the verge of surrendering his sick cat, Naji, and turns to RAPS for help. A bonanza of bikes uncovered by the picking team may come with a criminal past.
- Episode 103 – "Pets In Peril": A life-threatening mystery illness afflicting Ceelo the Doberman puppy, has the entire RAPS vet team in detective mode, hurrying to find a diagnosis. Shar Pei puppy Cardamom demonstrates why cute can be complicated. The pickers trying to raise money to pay for animal hospital treatments uncover a royal treasure in one of the abandoned bins.
- Episode 104 – "Mission Pawsible?": A dumped dog named Goobs wins the RAPS team's hearts and rekindles Eyal's long-time goal to build a dog sanctuary. Shadow, a two-year-old Pitbull mix, has a potentially cancerous lump on his neck, while Lilou, a nine-year-old cat, finally gets a diagnosis to explain her aggressive and unusual behavior. At the thrift store, Karen and her team of pickers hit a jewelry jackpot.
- Episode 105 – "Raining Cats And Dogs": A stray dog arrives at RAPS in rough shape and the team comes together to help him, but soon discovers his surprising story. William, a street-wise cat rescued by the Cat Sanctuary, amazes Dr. Maldonado with his resilience. Odin, a German Eurasier, heads into emergency surgery after his owner discovers the dog can't sit down. Karen is handed a huge picking challenge from Eyal, and is determined to make it happen.
- Episode 106 – "Animal Crackers": A black cat with breathing problems gives the vets a run for their money as she lives up to her name of Hades, Greek God of Hell. Bucky, a senior Labrador, scares Dr. Alex and Allison when he takes a frightening turn during routine surgery, and Lucy, a hedgehog surprises her owner with undetected health issues. When Karen and her team of pickers are frustrated by the lack of treasures in "Bin City", Marty raises the idea of an auction to amp up their profits.
- Episode 107 – "‘Claws’It Conditions": A sudden shift in her dog Dino's anxiety level has owner Deighen sacrificing her own mental health treatments and turning to RAPS for answers. Owner Shannon worries her dog, Dexter, is becoming increasingly nippy and confused, a problem Dr. Victoria Cruz-Mendez wrestles with first-hand. The final push at "Bin City" needs to reap big rewards if Eyal's dream of a dog sanctuary is to get within striking distance of its $100,000 goal.
- Episode 108 – "Ulti-Mutt Ambition": When treating their dog's allergy plunges a young couple deep into debt, Eyal makes a pledge that puts extra pressure on the RAPS picking team to deliver. A snake's reluctance to eat has its owners seeking the expertise of exotic pet specialist Dr. Joseph Martinez. Karen's heart sinks when she arrives at an auction day parking lot that is mostly empty.

=== Season 2 ===
- Episode 201– "Tall Tails": Benny, a Pitbull mix, undergoes surgery for a large cancerous lump. Tigger the cat arrives with mysterious injuries.
- Episode 202 – "Anything’s Pawsible": Milo the dog may not survive dental surgery due to a heart condition. Wong Choi the turtle gets a creative repair for a damaged shell.
- Episode 203 – "Four-Legged Word": A cat with suspected broken knees leads the vets to make a difficult decision. Amy runs the thrift store while Karen takes her dog to RAPS.
- Episode 204 – "Cat-A-Tonic": The RAPS team is surprised by what is discovered in a Golden Doodle's stomach. The Boo Boo Kitty is treated for diabetes.
- Episode 205 – "Dog Day Afternoon": When a sick puppy arrives at RAPS, Alison goes above and beyond to save his life. A major accident at the thrift store sets the pickers on a new course.
- Episode 206 – "Top To Tail": Sami, a rescue dog from China, has a dangerous intestinal condition. A cat, aptly named Tumbleweed, can't stay balanced on his feet.
- Episode 207 – "Purrfect": When a puppy eats a tin can, Dr. Schwartz faces a new challenge. Izzy, a kitten from the Cat Sanctuary, wins the hearts of the RAPS team.
- Episode 208 – "Puppy Power": RAPS quarantines a puppy with a suspected contagious disease. Joey, an abused cat, has his new owner puzzled by patches of missing hair.

== Finds ==
In episode 202 ("Anything’s Pawsible"), thrift store manager Karen Kamach and her team discover a Comox Valley resident's late father's belongings inside an abandoned storage bin, including wood masks, family photographs, and a Father's Day gift she painted 36 years ago. The family received the items from the thrift store, noting, "We are so blessed," and "Thank you to all of the people who worked on this recovery."

== Awards ==
In 2023, Pets & Pickers was nominated for two Leo Awards, including "Best Direction" in an "Information, Lifestyle or Reality Program or Series" and "Best Screenwriting" in an "Information, Lifestyle or Reality Series" for the "Pets in Peril" episode in the first season.
