= Rust Valley Restorers =

2018 English-language television documentary series

- Genre: Documentary; Reality TV
- Created by: Matt Shewchuk, Tyson Hepburn
- Starring: Mike Hall; Avery Shoaf; Connor Charman-Hall; × Blair Smith
- Country of origin: Canada
- Original language: English
- No. of seasons: 5
- No. of episodes: 50

Production
- Production companies: Mayhem Entertainment; Corus Studios

Original release
- Network: History Channel; StackTV
- Release: 6 December 2018 – present

Rust Valley Restorers is a Canadian documentary series produced by Mayhem Entertainment for History in association with Corus Entertainment. Reruns of the series air on DTour (formerly Prime and TVTropolis). Internationally the series is distributed by Netflix and shown as a Netflix original series.

In the United States, seasons 1 and 2 are distributed by Netflix, while seasons 3 and 4 are distributed by Motor Trend+ (in which that streaming service refers to them as seasons 4 and 5, respectively).

== Premise ==
The series takes place in the South Shuswap, an area in Tappen, British Columbia, also known as "Rust Valley", which is known for its unique car community and junkyards. It is shot at a vintage automobile restoration shop run by skilled craftsmen who restore, trade and sell classic cars into collectible vehicles.

== Cast ==
=== Main ===
- Michael (Mike) Hall, born 4 February 1958, owner of Rust Bros Restorations. A rock blaster by profession, Hall began collecting cars in his teens and decades later owned over 400 parked on his property near the Trans-Canada Highway. He tried to sell both the cars and his property in 2016 but received no offers. When he raised the price in 2017, the story went viral and he received phone calls from prospective buyers. He also received offers from producers to create a documentary. Hall has also made a guest appearance on Discovery Canada TV show Highway Thru Hell. Hall then built a restoration workshop on his property and the show started in 2018.
- Avery Shoaf, a car-interested friend of Mike Hall's. Shoaf previously had a company which repaired heavy equipment and is known affectionately as "Muscle Car Macguyver" for his mechanical skills. In the first two seasons Avery worked at Rust Bros, first as a mechanic and later as shop manager, before leaving to start his own restoration business called Wildman Restorations.
- Connor Charman-Hall, Mike Hall's son who used to work in Avery Shoaf's business. Connor usually acts as the voice of reason and quarrels with his father over his spending habits and business acumen.

=== Rust Bros Staff ===
- Cassidy Mceown. Cassidy joined Rust Bros in the first season and is a ticketed Red Seal auto body tech.
- Sarah Ward. Sarah joined Rust Bros in 2018. Ward is the parts manager at the shop. She also helps putting finishing touches on the builds.
- Blair Smith. Blair joined in the third season as a body man, specializing in high end restorations. He returned in season four doing freelance work for Mike, before returning as shop manager for Rust Bros in season 5.

=== Recurring ===
- JF Launier. JF is the owner of JF Kustoms in Osoyoos, BC. JF specializes in high end restorations and has won several awards for his car restorations. JF is an accomplished driver and usually acts as a friendly rival to the Rust Bros crew in racing competitions.
- James West. James is the owner of Dubs Kustoms a metal fabrication shop in Kamloops, BC. He specializes in custom-designed cars and rat rods.
- Shafin Shoaf and Jacob Oudshoorn. Avery's two sons. Shafin initially worked with Avery at Wildman Restorations before leaving. Jacob is Avery's step son and would begin working with Avery in season four.
- "Big" Donny Kleinfelder. Known as the "Great White Shark", Donnie runs a scrapyard and towing company in Barrière, BC. He would later go on to star in his own spin off show "Backroad Truckers".

== Episodes ==
=== Series overview ===
Series	Episodes		Originally released	
Series	Episodes		First released	Last released
1	8		6 December 2018	7 February 2019
2	12	6	21 November 2019	26 December 2019
2	12	6	2 January 2020	6 February 2020
3	12		18 February 2021	6 May 2021
4	10		24 February 2022	23 June 2022
5	8		19 September 2024	7 November 2024

=== Season 1 (2018–19) ===
No. overall	No. in season	Title	Featured cars	Original release date
1	1	"Go Big or Go Home"	1966 Lincoln Continental Ragtop convertible and a 1970 Dodge Dart Swinger	6 December 2018
2	2	"All in the Family"	1964 Buick Riviera and a 1966 Beaumont Sport Deluxe.	13 December 2018
3	3	"Going Into Battle"	World War II-era 1941 Dodge Power Wagon and a 1968 Chevy Chevelle	20 December 2018
4	4	"Rustang to Mustang"	1966 Mustang and a 1968 Plymouth Satellite	27 December 2018
5	5	"A Smashing Success"	1969 Cadillac Coupe De Ville and a 1976 Chrysler New Yorker	17 January 2019
6	6	"Happy Endings"	1938 International Harvester	24 January 2019
7	7	"Rusty Dreams Come True"	1941 Ford Super Deluxe and a 1964 Ford Fairlane 500	31 January 2019
8	8	"Race to the Finish!"	1966 Chevy II and a 1964 Ford F100	7 February 2019

=== Season 2 (2019–20) ===
No. overall	No. in season	Title	Featured cars	Original release date
Part 1
9	0909	"Blast From the Past"	1970 Dodge Super Bee and 1968 Chevrolet Camaro	21 November 2019
10	2	"We're All a Little Mad"	1966 Pontiac Parisienne and 1983 GMC Truck	28 November 2019
11	3	"Frenemy"	1966 Pontiac Parisienne and JF Kustoms – 1967 Pontiac GTO	5 December 2019
12	4	"Rise from the Ashes"	1968 Chevelle SS and Dubs Kustoms – The Widow Maker.	12 December 2019
13	5	"Pedal to the Medal"	1968 Chevy El Camino SS and JF Kustoms – Ford Crown Victoria	19 December 2019
14	6	"The Same Mistakes"	1967 Mercury Cougar and 1926 Ford Model T	26 December 2019
Part 2
15	7	"Life is Messy"	1967 Mercury Cougar and 1969 Plymouth Road Runner	2 January 2020
16	8	"The Ridler"	1969 Plymouth Road Runner and JF Kustoms – 1964 Acadian Anvil	9 January 2020
17	9	"Basket Case"	1976 Chevy Custom Deluxe and 1942 Harley-Davidson WLC	16 January 2020
18	10	"The Reckoning"	1965 GMC Handi-Van	23 January 2020
19	11	"Secret Stash"	1965 GMC Handi-Van and 1938 Buick Special Opera	30 January 2020
20	12	"Should I Stay or Should I Go"	1961 Sunbeam Alpine and 1966 Kaiser M35 Deuce and a Half	6 February 2020

=== Season 3 (2021) ===
No. overall	No. in season	Title	Featured cars	Original release date
21	1	"In Rust We Trust"	1971 Chevrolet Camaro & 1981 International School Bus	18 February 2021
22	2	"Wildman Incorporated"	1963 Mercedes Unimog 411a & 1968 GM Beaumont	25 February 2021
23	3	"High Octane"	1957 GMC "Blue Chip" Pickup Truck	4 March 2021
24	4	"Unlikely Alliances"	1947 Willys-Overland Jeep Truck & 1964 Ford F-100	11 March 2021
25	5	"Transformer Truck"	1971 Chevrolet Blazer CST & (1985 Chevrolet C10)	18 March 2021
26	6	"Double or Nothing"	1954 Hudson Jet	25 March 2021
27	7	"Hit to Pass: Part 1"	1973 Cadillac Fleetwood Seventy-Five	1 April 2021
28	8	"Hit to Pass: Part 2"	N/A	8 April 2021
29	9	"Mom...Come Home"	1951 3100 Series ½ Ton Pickup & Manta Montage	15 April 2021
30	10	"Cab-Over Budget"	1956 C-800 w/ Sleeper & 1955 Chevrolet Bel Air Wagon	22 April 2021
31	11	"Bad Dreams"	1951 Mercury M-Series Truck, 2002 Chevrolet Corvette & 1966 Chevrolet Chevelle Malibu	29 April 2021
32	12	"The Secret"	1947 Mercury 114 Super Deluxe	6 May 2021

=== Season 4 (2022) ===
No. overall	No. in season	Title	Featured cars	Original release date
33	1	"Scorched Earth"	1955 American LaFrance-Foamite 700/800 Series Fire Apparatus, 1959 Volkswagen Transporter Truck & 1969 Plymouth Barracuda Convertible	24 February 2022
34	2	"Hot Diggity Dog"	(1953 American LaFrance-Foamite 700/800 Series Fire Apparatus)	3 March 2022
35	3	"The Naked Truth"	1971 Dodge Charger 340 Magnum Super Bee RamCharger & 1966 Chevrolet Impala Wagon	10 March 2022
36	4	"Some Assembly Required"	(1960 Chevrolet Bel Air Delivery) & (1971 Dodge Charger 340 Magnum Super Bee RamCharger)	17 March 2022
37	5	"Four Cars And A Wedding"	N/A	19 May 2022
38	6	"Fuel To The Fire"	1931 Essex Super Six Speedabout Boattail Roadster	26 May 2022
39	7	"Nobody's Perfect"	N/A	2 June 2022
40	8	"Crushing It"	N/A	9 June 2022
41	9	"The Family Circus"	1964 Pontiac Parisienne Safari & 1972 Ford Bronco Ranger Wagon	16 June 2022
42	10	"No Reserve"	N/A	23 June 2022

=== Season 5 (2024) ===
No. overall	No. in season	Title	Featured cars	Original release date
43	1	"Scouts Honour"	1971 International Scout II & 1955 Ford Thunderbird convertible	19 September 2024
44	2	"Mike M.I.A"	(1969 Plymouth Road Runner convertible) & 1974 Austin Mini	26 September 2024
45	3	"A Little Help from My Friends"	1956 Dodge Pickup & (Antique Rail Car Semi Trailer)	3 October 2024
46	4	"A Tale of Two Engines"	1966 Ford Mustang Shelby GT350-H	10 October 2024
47	5	"Time Machines"	JF Kustoms – 1928 Ford Model "A" Roadster & Wildman Restorations – 1941 M3 half-track	17 October 2024
48	6	"Blind Spot"	1941 M3 half-track & 1948 Diamond T Model 509	24 October 2024
49	7	"Gold Fever"	1955 Cadillac Fleetwood Series 60	31 October 2024
50	8	"Diamond in the Rough"	1948 Diamond T Model 509	7 November 2024

Parenthesis used for cars featured, but not historically highlighted.

== Release ==
In December 2018, Rust Valley Restorers premiered on the History Canadian Channel, and on 23 August 2019 the series was released to Netflix. A second season was ordered and a trailer was released on 22 October 2019 with the season premiering on 21 November 2019. The second season was released to Netflix on 8 May 2020. The second season was split into two parts for the Netflix release with each part consisting of six episodes.
