= Alaska Wing Men =

- Country of origin: United States
- Original language: English
- No. of seasons: 2
- No. of episodes: 13

Production
- Production locations: Alaska, United States
- Running time: 60 minutes

Original release
- Network: National Geographic Channel
- Release: January 10, 2011 – March 16, 2012

Alaska Wing Men is an American documentary television series on the National Geographic Channel. The show primarily follows the daily lives of bush pilots that fly to and from various small rural villages throughout Alaska. The series premiered on January 10, 2011.

== List of episodes ==
=== Season 1 (2011) ===
No.	Title	Original release date
1	"Explosive Cargo"	January 10, 2011
2	"Gold Rush"	January 10, 2011
3	"Deadly Skies"	January 10, 2011

=== Season 2 (2012) ===
No.	Title	Original release date
1	"Suicide Sled Race"	January 2, 2012
2	"Ski Chopper Daredevils"	January 9, 2012
3	"Sky Fishing"	January 20, 2012
4	"Grizzly 911"	January 27, 2012
5	"Convict on Board"	February 3, 2012
6	"Escape from Bear Island"	February 10, 2012
7	"Deadly Descent"	February 17, 2012
8	"High Voltage Hazard"	March 2, 2012
9	"Fire Fight"	March 9, 2012
10	"Man Down"	March 16, 2012

== See also ==
- Flying Wild Alaska
- Ice Pilots
