= John Driftmier =

Canadian director

John Driftmier (November 24, 1982 – February 24, 2013) was a Canadian documentary director. His works included Dangerous Flights, Licence to Drill, and Ice Pilots NWT.

== Early life ==
Driftmier was born in 1982 in Calgary, Alberta to parents David Driftmier and Sophia Lang. He graduated from Simon Fraser University in 2007. While studying film at SFU, Driftmier produced and directed the film The Story of a Lifetime, both a tribute to and using footage shot by his grandfather, Frederick, who as a teacher in 1941 had shot amateur films in Sudan.

Driftmier married Carolyn Allen in 2010. They lived in Ottawa, Ontario.

== Career ==
Driftmier worked in more than 30 countries. He shot a company of northern Canadian pilots in the television series Ice Pilots NWT. In Highway Thru Hell, he documented the stories of a towing company involved in salvage operations in the British Columbia interior in extreme weather conditions. He co-created Pyros, a TV documentary series looking at people who create firework displays.

In 2013, while in Africa to film an episode of Dangerous Flights, documenting the experiences around the world of pilots delivering used commuter airplanes, Driftmier was killed at age 30 in a plane crash in Mount Kenya Forest.

The documentary series Cold Water Cowboys, which Driftmier co-conceived with Tyson Hepburn, debuted in February 2014.
