= Ice Pilots NWT =

Canadian reality television series

- Genre: Reality
- Created by: David Gullason
- Written by: Todd Serotiuk; Mark Fuller
- Directed by: Lionel Goddard; Brad Quenville; John Driftmier
- Starring: Chuck Adams; Jeff Schroeder; Sean Barry; Scott Blue; Devan Brooks; Gord Cooling; Corey Dodd; Jynelle Glenn; Duane Hicks; Joe McBryan; Mikey McBryan; Justin Simle; Arnie Schreder; Kelly Jurasevich; AJ Decoste; Jeremy Dow; Audrey Marchand; Wilf Darr; Ray Weber
- Narrated by: Michael Daingerfield
- Opening theme: "Fly Away" by Lenny Kravitz (Canadian broadcast) "Airplanes" by David Usher (American broadcast)
- Country of origin: Canada
- Original language: English
- No. of seasons: 6
- No. of episodes: 65 (list of episodes)

Production
- Executive producers: Gabriela Schonbach; Michael Chechik; David Gullason
- Producer: David Gullason
- Production locations: Yellowknife, NWT; Hay River, NWT
- Editors: Diana Bodnar; Larry Raskin; Peter Steel; Deane Bennet; Al Flett
- Running time: Approximately 45 minutes
- Production company: Omni Film Productions

Original release
- Network: History Television
- Release: November 18, 2009 – December 17, 2014

Related
- Ice Road Truckers

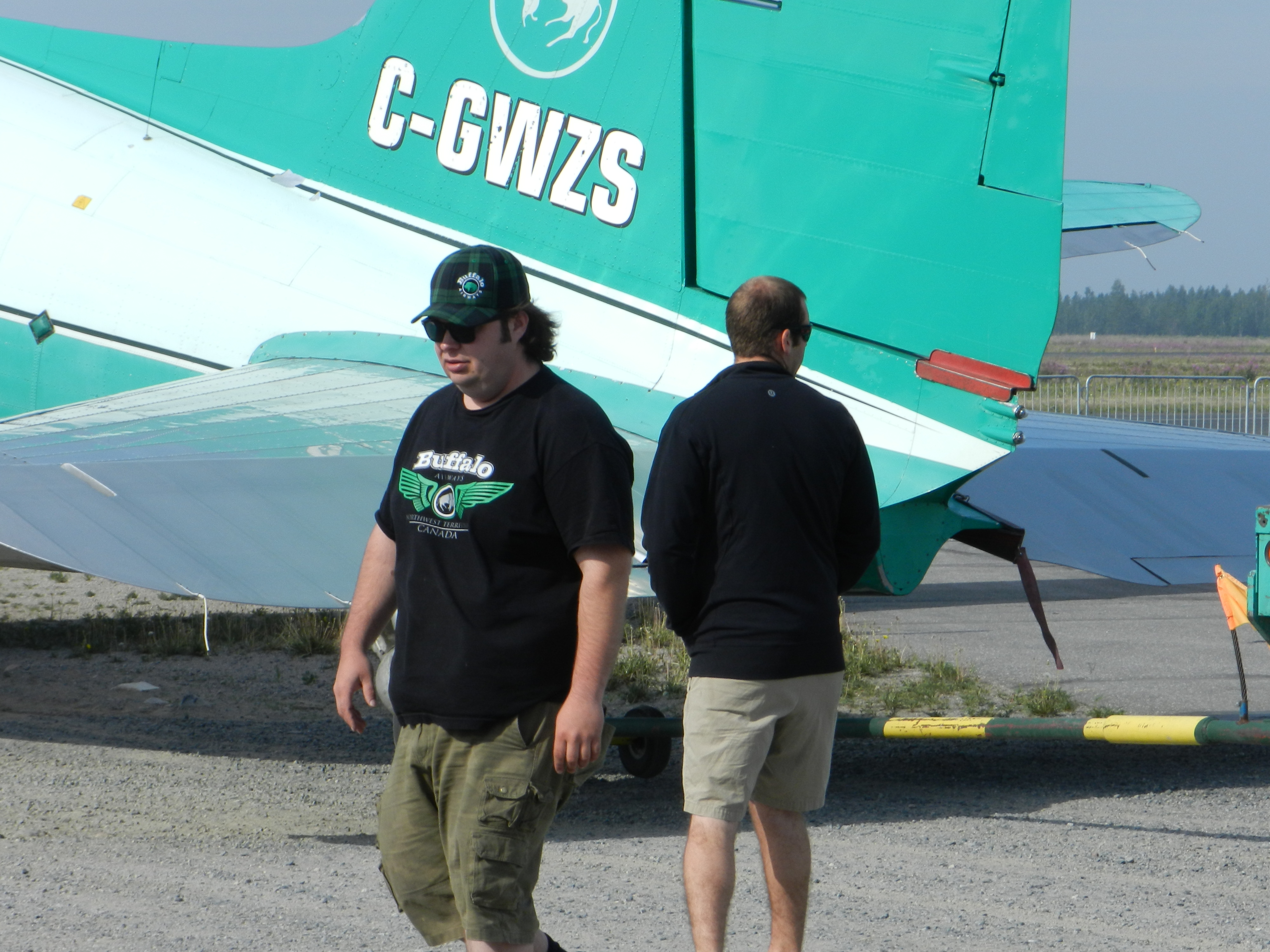
Mike McBryan of Buffalo Air

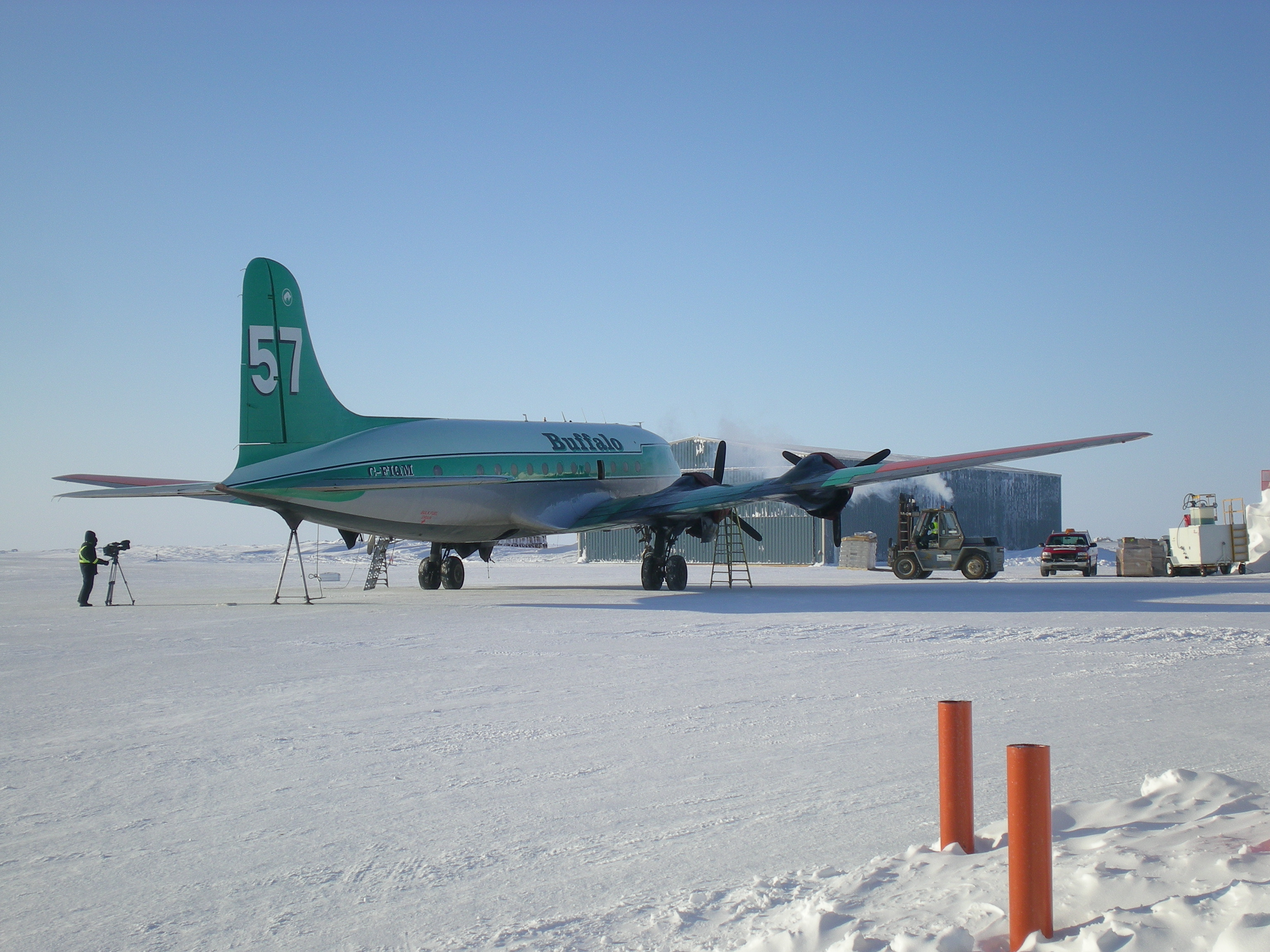
Filming C-FIQM for Ice Pilots at Cambridge Bay Airport. Temperature −33.3 °C (−27.9 °F)

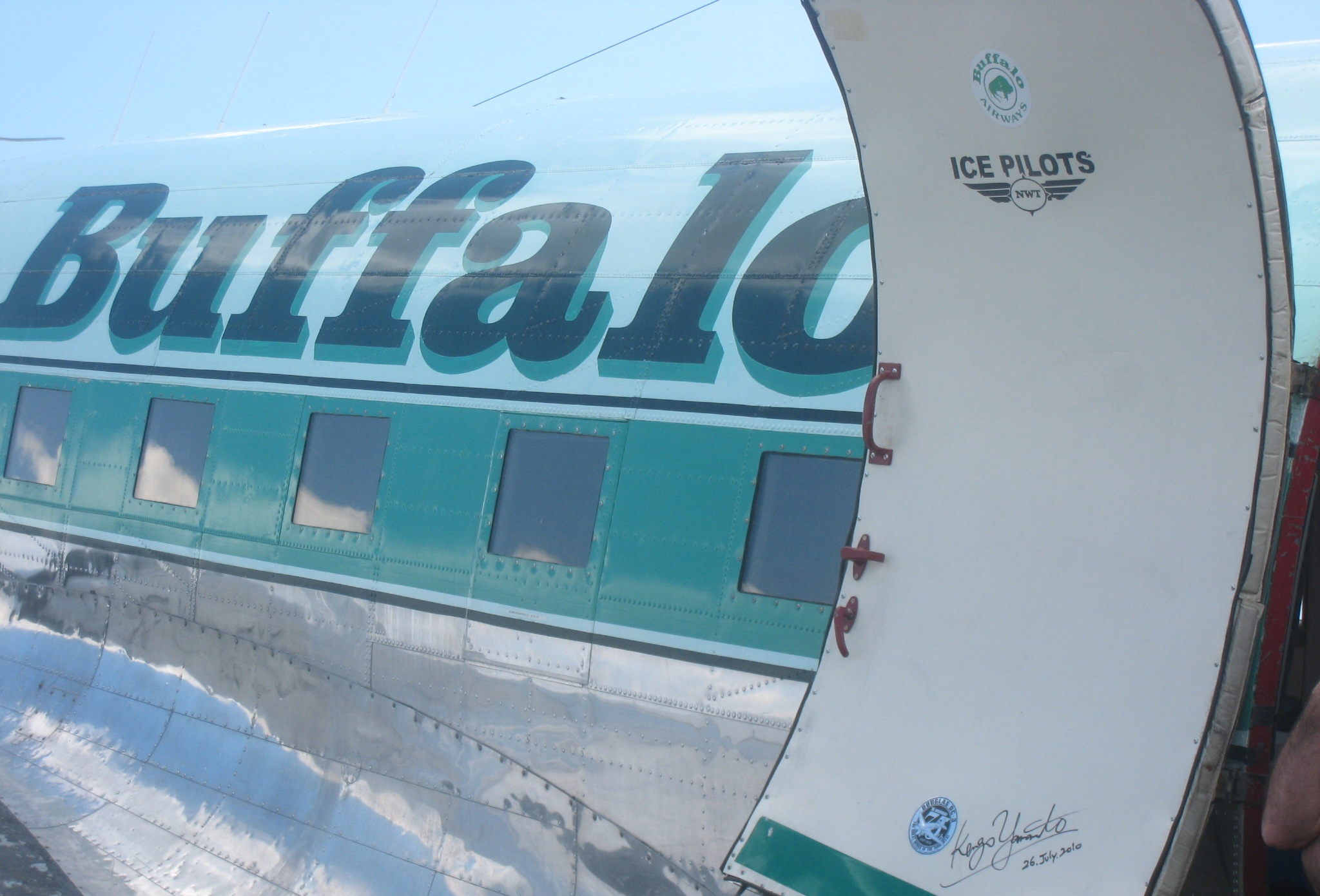
Buffalo DC-3

Ice Pilots NWT (known in the UK and the US as Ice Pilots) is a Canadian reality television series broadcast on History Television that portrays Buffalo Airways, an airline based in Yellowknife, Northwest Territories, Canada. Buffalo mainly flies WWII-era piston powered propeller planes as well as Lockheed L-188 Electra turboprop aircraft year-round in northern Canada. The show aired from November 18, 2009, to December 17, 2014, comprising six seasons.

== History ==
Ice Pilots premiered on November 18, 2009. The show was renewed for a second season with filming completed on August 2, 2010. The season premiere was aired on History Television January 12, 2011. Season 3 was greenlit on August 18, 2010, and began airing on October 12, 2011. In the UK, series 2 was shown on Quest commencing May 2011. The episodes in season 4 have been shown on the Discovery Channel in the UK. Season 1 of Ice Pilots began airing on the National Geographic Channel in the US on April 22, 2011. Both Season 1 and 2 have aired in Australia on National Geographic Channel and National Geographic Channel HD, and currently air on the digital channel 7 Mate.

On February 2, 2012 The Weather Channel announced that it was adding Ice Pilots to its primetime lineup. On March 5, 2012, the show started airing on The Weather Channel, starting with seasons 1 and 2.

The National Geographic Channel no longer airs the show regularly, though it does occasionally broadcast episodes.

Ice Pilots NWT has been recognized with two Gemini Awards in 2011 for Best Original Music for a Lifestyle/Practical Information or Reality Program or Series and Best Photography in an Information Program or Series.

On July 27, 2012, Bruce Dickinson, lead singer of Iron Maiden, flew up from Edmonton to Yellowknife with Buffalo Airways. On July 28, Dickinson, who holds an airline transport pilot's license, flew a Douglas DC3 to Yellowknife and spent a day being filmed as a guest star for a season four episode.

On September 24, 2013, the Ice Pilots NWT Facebook page aired the first season 5 trailer, as well as the season 5 premiere date of October 23, 2013.

On January 15, 2014, the season 6 production was announced. Promos for season six stated that it would be the final season. It premiered on October 29, 2014. The final episode aired on December 17, 2014. The final episode covered a parachute jump over the D-Day remembrance period of June 2014.

As of June 2023, it can be watched on Pluto TV.

== Cast ==
The cast/crew of Ice Pilots NWT consists of the following people:

Person	Role	Seasons	Notes
Chuck Adams	Mechanic/in-flight engineer	1 – 6	Resigned from Buffalo early in season 3 but returned in season 4
David Alexandre	First Officer	3 – 6	DC-3, C-46 and Electra Co-Pilot
Sean Barry	First Officer	1 – 4	Resigned from Buffalo in season 4 to work for First Air. Electra and DC-4 Co-Pilot
Scott Blue	First Officer	1 – 5	C-46 and CL215 Co-Pilot, Electra Flight Engineer
Ian Bottomley	Captain	1, 4, 6	DC-3 Captain, C-46 Co-Pilot
Devan Brooks	Captain	1 – 6	Resigned from Buffalo after season 4 for farm work in Ontario, but returned to Buffalo in season 5 for contracted operations. C-46, DC-3, and DC-4 Captain
Gord Cooling	Captain	1 – 3	Resigned from Buffalo and joined First Air. DC-3 and C-46 Captain.
AJ Decoste	Chief Pilot	1 – 6	Succeeded Justin Simle as Chief Pilot in season 6. DC-3, C-46, DC-4 and Electra Captain.
Corey Dodd	CL-215 lead engineer	1 – 6	Trained to become an Electra flight engineer in season 6
Jeremy Dow	Ramp hand	1	Laid off after season 1 taping
Jules D'Souza	Ramp hand	3	Resigned late in season 3 and joined Wabusk Air
Laurent Dussault	Ramp hand and co-pilot	3	C-46 Co-Pilot
James Dwojak	Aircraft engineer AME	1 – 6	
Cliff Dyson	Mechanic/in-flight engineer	2 – 6	
Jim Essery	Mechanic	1 – 3	Featured in season 3 episode 11. Died on September 1, 2012, in a drowning accident
Graeme Ferguson	Ramp hand and co-pilot	2 – 6	DC-3, DC-4 and Electra Co-Pilot
Jynelle Glenn	Courier manager	1 – 3, 5	Married to Devan Brooks (have a child in season 4), resigned early in season 3; made an appearance in season 5 visiting Yellowknife with their son
Brian Harrison	Captain	1 – 6	Electra Captain
Duane Hicks	Senior manager	3 – 4	Finished at Buffalo late in season 3; assisted Mike McBryan in season 4 during an auction.
Kelly Jurasevich	Cargo manager	1 – 4	Resigned from Buffalo in season 4. Died on January 10, 2017.
Audrey Marchand	Ramp hand and co-pilot	1 – 3, 5	Resigned early in season 3 to work as a WestJet cabin crew member (eventually worked at Air Creebec); co-piloted a DC-3 with Devan Brooks to Buffalo's maintenance facility in Red Deer, Alberta in season 5 after getting a few days off her job
Joe McBryan	President of Buffalo Airways and captain	1 – 6	
Kathy McBryan	Hay River manager	2 – 6	Middle child of Joe McBryan
Mike McBryan	General manager	1 – 6	Youngest child of Joe McBryan
Rod McBryan	Director of maintenance/ Accountable Executive	1 – 6	Oldest child of Joe McBryan; became Buffalo's accountable executive (in charge of ensuring the airline adheres to all Transport Canada regulations), taking over from his father
Christine Povey	Co-pilot and Ramp hand	4 – 5	Trialed at Buffalo in season 4 after quitting her job as a dental assistant back in Toronto; returned to Buffalo on a full-time basis in season 5
Arnie Schreder	Former Chief Pilot	1 – 4	Retired late in season 2, but returned in seasons 3 and 4. Died on May 5, 2012, of small-cell lung cancer
Justin Simle	Chief Pilot	1 – 5	Became Chief Pilot in season 3 after Arnie Schreder's retirement; left Buffalo after season 5 to start his own airline. DC-3, DC-4 and CL215 Captain.
Tyler Sipos	Ramp hand	3 – 5	Resigned from Buffalo in season 5 to fly for Air Georgian
Adam Smith	Mechanic/in-flight engineer	1 – 6	
Sophie the Dog	Mascot and co-pilot	1 – 6	Died in season 6
Raman Srivastava	Ramp hand	1	Resigned during season 1 to return home to India
Chris Staples	Cargo Manager / Apprenticing Mechanic / First Officer	4 - 6	C-46 First Officer. Appeared in several episodes.
Alex Wagner	Co-pilot, bird dog pilot	1, 3	DC-4 and Beech Baron Co-pilot
Ray Weber	Captain	1 – 4	Retired in season 4. Electra Captain.
Andrew Weich	Ramp hand and co-pilot	1 – 4	Resigned in season 4 to fly for Cathay Pacific

== Aircraft featured ==
Airplane	Seasons
Curtiss C-46 Commando	1 – 6
Douglas DC-3	1 – 6
Douglas DC-4	1 – 5
Lockheed L-188 Electra	1 – 6
Canadair CL-215	1 – 5
Beechcraft Baron	1 – 6
Beechcraft Travel Air	2 – 5
Beechcraft King Air	6
Consolidated PBY Catalina	3
Cessna 150	4
Douglas DC-6	5

== Episode listing ==
Seasons 1 through 5 each have 13 episodes. Season 6 only has 8. It was explained that season 6 has fewer episodes than other seasons because the filming decision for a season 6 was made later than the others, leading to less footage and materials being available.

Season	Episodes	Channel	Airdate
1	13	History Television	November 18, 2009 – February 13, 2010
2	13	History Television	January 12, 2011 – April 6, 2011
3	13	History Television	October 12, 2011 – January 19, 2012
4	13	History Television	November 7, 2012 – February 6, 2013
5	13	History Television	October 23, 2013 – January 29, 2014
6	8	History Television	October 29, 2014 – December 17, 2014

== Accolades ==
Ice Pilots NWT won several Leo Awards, Gemini Awards, and was nominated for the Canadian Screen Awards.

List of accolades
Award	Category	Episode	Result
Gemini Awards (2010)	Best Sound in an Information/Documentary Program or Series	"The Crash"	Won
Leo Awards (2010)	Best Cinematography in a Documentary Program or Series	"Transatlantic Crossing"	Nominated
Leo Awards (2010)	Best Direction in a Documentary Program or Series	"Transatlantic Crossing"	Nominated
Leo Awards (2010)	Best Documentary Series	—N/a	Won
Leo Awards (2010)	Best Overall Sound in a Documentary Program or Series	"Suspension"	Nominated
Leo Awards (2010)	Best Picture Editing in a Documentary Program or Series	"The Crash"	Nominated
Leo Awards (2010)	Best Screenwriting in a Documentary Program or Series	"Transatlantic Crossing"	Won
Leo Awards (2010)	Best Screenwriting in a Documentary Program or Series	"Thin Ice"	Nominated
Leo Awards (2010)	Best Sound Editing in a Documentary Program or Series	"Suspension"	Won
Gemini Awards (2011)	Best Direction in a Lifestyle/Practical Information Program or Series	—N/a	Nominated
Gemini Awards (2011)	Best Original Music for a Lifestyle/Practical Information or Series	—N/a	Won
Gemini Awards (2011)	Best Photography Lifestyle/Practical Information Program or Series	—N/a	Won
Gemini Awards (2011)	Best Sound in an Information/Documentary Program or Series	"Under Pressure"	Nominated
Leo Awards (2012)	Best Screenwriting in a Documentary Program or Series	—N/a	Nominated
Leo Awards (2012)	Best Short Documentary Program	—N/a	Won
Canadian Cinema Editors Awards (2013)	Best Editing in Lifestyle/Reality	"Crash Landing"	Won
2nd Canadian Screen Awards (2014)	Best Documentary Series	—N/a	Nominated
3rd Canadian Screen Awards (2015)	Best Factual Program or Series	—N/a	Won
4th Canadian Screen Awards (2016)	Best Factual Program or Series	—N/a	Nominated
4th Canadian Screen Awards (2016)	Best Direction in a Documentary or Factual Series	"D-Day"	Won
4th Canadian Screen Awards (2016)	Best Writing in a Factual Program or Series	"D-Day"	Won
